= Electoral boundary changes of the 2025 Singaporean general election =

The Electoral Boundaries Review Committee (EBRC), which reviews and updates the Singaporean electoral map before every general election, was convened on 22 January 2025 for the 2025 general election. The EBRC released their report on 11 March, which called for the creation of 18 group representation constituencies (GRCs) and 15 single-member constituencies (SMCs). This increased the number of elected Members of Parliament (MP) in the next parliament by four seats, with a total of 97.

The report introduced six SMCs: Jurong Central, Sembawang West, Bukit Gombak, Jalan Kayu, Queenstown, and Tampines Changkat. Five SMCs were absorbed into neighbouring GRCs. Several GRCs in the east and west were reorganised. Jurong GRC was split between two newly-established GRCs, Jurong East–Bukit Batok and West Coast–Jurong West; West Coast GRC was renamed West Coast–Jurong West GRC. Pasir Ris–Punggol GRC was split into Pasir Ris–Changi and Punggol GRCs. Marine Parade GRC was renamed Marine Parade–Braddell Heights GRC after absorbing the entirety of MacPherson SMC and parts of Potong Pasir and Mountbatten SMCs. Four SMCs (Bukit Panjang, Hougang, Marymount and Pioneer) and five GRCs (Bishan–Toa Payoh, Jalan Besar, Marsiling–Yew Tee, Nee Soon and Sengkang), for a total of nine constituencies, were left untouched in the redistricting cycle.

According to the EBRC, these changes were to account for the uneven distribution of growth in the number of electors across the existing electoral divisions. Nevertheless, the South China Morning Post observed that the redrawn constituencies were areas where the governing People's Action Party (PAP) faced strong competition against the opposition in the previous election. The boundary changes were accepted by the Singapore government, but some opposition parties considered the changes "drastic" and criticised the redrawing process for lacking transparency.

== History ==
=== Background ===
The electoral divisions in Singapore are organised into single-member constituencies (SMCs) and group representation constituencies (GRCs). Each SMC returns one Member of Parliament (MP) using the first past the post voting system, while each GRC returns four or five MPs by party block voting. At least one candidate in the GRC must be from the Malay, Indian or other minority communities. A group of candidates intending to contest an election in a GRC must all be members of the same political party, or a group of independent candidates. Elections are conducted by the Elections Department (ELD), a department under the Prime Minister's Office.

Before elections could be called, the Electoral Boundaries Review Committee (EBRC) had to be convened. The EBRC evaluates the existing electoral boundaries and recommends adjustments based on changes in the electorate such as population shifts and housing developments. The opposition has accused the PAP of gerrymandering and called for reforms in the redrawing process, which included appointing a High Court judge as the chairperson of the EBRC instead of the Secretary to the Prime Minister. Minister-in-charge of the Public Service Chan Chun Sing denied the claims and insisted that the ERBC "[functioned] independently and objectively" in the voters' interests. The proposed reform motion was rejected by 76 MPs in August 2024.

The EBRC was convened on 22 January 2025 for the 2025 general election. Its members included Tan Kee Yong (as chairperson), Lim Zhi Yang (as secretary), Tan Meng Dui (the returning officer for the previous election), Colin Low Hsien Yang, and Koh Eng Chuan.

=== Report release ===
The EBRC released their report on 11 March, which called for the creation of 18 GRCs and 15 SMCs. According to the report, the changes made to the electoral map were to account for the uneven distribution of growth in the number of electors across the existing electoral divisions. The number of MPs in the next parliament was increased to 97 elected seats.

The report introduced six SMCs: Jurong Central, Sembawang West, Bukit Gombak (last seen in the 1997 general election), Jalan Kayu, Queenstown, and Tampines Changkat. Five SMCs (Bukit Batok, Hong Kah North, MacPherson, Punggol West, and Yuhua) were absorbed into neighbouring GRCs. The boundaries for four existing SMCs were left untouched, namely Bukit Panjang, Hougang, Marymount, and Pioneer.

Owing to population and electorate growth in several GRCs from the eastern and western Singapore, these wards were either reorganised into new GRCs or redistricted elsewhere. A majority of Jurong GRC was split into the newly-established Jurong East–Bukit Batok, with the remainder of western Jurong and Taman Jurong distributed to West Coast–Jurong West GRC. The overpopulated Pasir Ris–Punggol GRC was hived into two new four-member GRCs of Pasir Ris–Changi and Punggol. Marine Parade GRC was also renamed Marine Parade–Braddell Heights GRC as it absorbed MacPherson, a part of Potong Pasir and Mountbatten. The remaining five GRCs of Bishan–Toa Payoh, Jalan Besar, Marsiling–Yew Tee, Nee Soon and Sengkang were left untouched.

While opposition-held wards were usually left untouched in the redistricting cycle, Aljunied GRC had three polling districts east of Bedok Reservoir redistricted to the neighbouring Tampines GRC. Kebun Baru and Yio Chu Kang SMCs also had relatively minor changes, with one division from Lentor being transferred from Yio Chu Kang to Kebun Baru.

According to the ELD, the renaming of Jurong, Marine Parade and West Coast GRCs was to "better reflect the identities of the geographical areas in the GRCs".

== Main changes ==
Electoral boundary changes between 2020 and 2025

2020 electoral boundaries

2025 electoral boundaries

The changes made in the electoral divisions are as follows:

Name of constituency	Changes
Aljunied GRC	Portions of Bedok Reservoir areas and Temasek Polytechnic in Bedok Reservoir–Punggol division redistricted to Tampines GRC.
Ang Mo Kio GRC	Portions of Jalan Kayu and Fernvale divisions became newly created Jalan Kayu SMC; the remainder was split into Buangkok–Fernvale South and Seletar–Serangoon divisions respectively. Cheng San–Seletar division renamed Cheng San.
Chua Chu Kang GRC	Southernmost part of Bukit Gombak became newly created SMC. Absorbed Tengah new town from Hong Kah North SMC (split into existing Brickland ward (eventually renamed Brickland–Tengah) & newly formed Tengah division), and Rail Green portion of Holland–Bukit Timah GRC.
East Coast GRC	Changi portion (including Pedra Branca, Pulau Tekong, Pulau Ubin, Changi Airport and Changi Village) of Siglap division redistricted to Pasir Ris–Changi GRC. Build-To-Order (BTO) public housing projects in Tampines redistricted to Tampines Changkat SMC. Absorbed Kampong Chai Chee and Joo Chiat portions from Marine Parade GRC. Siglap division abolished.
Holland–Bukit Timah GRC	Junction 10 and Rail Green BTOs redistricted to Chua Chu Kang GRC, absorbed polling district from defunct Jurong GRC.
Kebun Baru SMC	One polling district in Lentor (comprising Thomson Grove condominium) redistricted from Yio Chu Kang SMC to Kebun Baru SMC.
Yio Chu Kang SMC	One polling district in Lentor (comprising Thomson Grove condominium) redistricted from Yio Chu Kang SMC to Kebun Baru SMC.
Jurong East–Bukit Batok GRC	New Constituency; Formed from SMCs of Bukit Batok (entirety), Hong Kah North (Bukit Batok portion), and Yuhua (majority), and eastern Jurong GRC (except newly created Jurong Central SMC).
Marine Parade–Braddell Heights GRC	New Constituency; Formed from Marine Parade GRC, the entirety of MacPherson SMC and selected polling districts in Mountbatten and Potong Pasir SMCs. Joo Chiat and Chai Chee divisions redistricted into East Coast GRC, Kembangan–Chai Chee renamed Kembangan.
Pasir Ris–Changi GRC	New Constituency; Formed from Pasir Ris section of Pasir Ris–Punggol GRC and Changi portion of East Coast GRC.
Punggol GRC	New Constituency; Formed from Punggol section of Pasir Ris–Punggol GRC and entirety of Punggol West SMC. Punggol Coast division split to form Punggol North.
Sembawang GRC	Carved out Sembawang West division into SMC.
Tampines GRC	Absorbed Bedok Reservoir and Temasek Polytechnic areas from Aljunied GRC. Tampines Changkat division became SMC. Tampines Neighbourhood 6 carved from Tampines Central, North & East divisions to form Tampines Boulevard.
Tanjong Pagar GRC	Queenstown division carved into SMC. Absorbed one-north, Dover and Telok Blangah portions of West Coast GRC.
West Coast–Jurong West GRC	New Constituency; Formed from West Coast GRC (excluding one-north, Dover, Telok Blangah, HarbourFront and Sentosa), and majority of Jurong Spring and Taman Jurong divisions of Jurong GRC. Gek Poh portion merged with Jurong Spring to create Jurong Spring–Gek Poh division.

== Reactions ==
The boundary changes were accepted by the Singapore government. Janil Puthucheary, a senior minister of state and a PAP cadre, felt the extensive changes were "appropriate" and reflected the country's population growth. On the other hand, the opposition parties accused ELD officials of gerrymandering. The Workers' Party (WP) acknowledged the "significant changes" in areas where it has been active in recent years but refrained from direct criticism. The party stated that it would announce where it planned to contest "in due course". WP chief and Leader of the Opposition Pritam Singh called it "one of the most radical redrawing of boundaries Singapore has seen in recent memory". While the Progress Singapore Party (PSP) was "heartened that the EBRC has somewhat disclosed more of the reasoning behind its decisions, contrary to its previous report in 2020", the party felt that "the EBRC could have accounted for population shifts without making drastic changes to existing major electoral boundaries". The PSP examined the EBRC report before announcing where it would contest.

The Singapore Democratic Party (SDP) expressed "disappointment with the disappearance of Yuhua and Bukit Batok SMCs" – the electoral districts where the SDP planned to contest – and claimed the process of redrawing boundaries "lacked transparency". The People's Power Party (PPP) also claimed that the ERBC report was "skewed to protect [the PAP's] electoral interests", but planned to contest in the new Jalan Kayu and Tampines Changkat SMCs alongside Ang Mo Kio, Nee Soon, and Tampines GRCs. Lim Tean, leader of the People's Alliance for Reform (PAR), criticised "wanton redrawing of the electoral boundaries" and protested against the incorporation of Mountbatten SMC and parts of Potong Pasir SMC into Marine Parade–Braddell Heights. Its component party, Peoples Voice (PV), was active in these districts. Nevertheless, Lim declared that his coalition was ready to contest in 10 constituencies.

The Singapore Democratic Alliance planned to contest in Pasir Ris–Changi GRC, and was open to discussions with WP regarding the boundary changes for Punggol GRC. Spencer Ng, the secretary general of the National Solidarity Party (NSP), said that the party was "deeply disappointed and perplexed" by the electoral boundary changes. The NSP planned to contest in Sembawang West and Tampines Changkat, and in the GRCs of Jalan Besar, Marine Parade–Braddell Heights, Marsiling–Yew Tee, Sembawang, and Tampines. Ravi Philemon of Red Dot United (RDU) argued that opposition strongholds in the west had been fragmented to create competition among opposition parties. The RDU announced its plans to contest in Jurong East–Bukit Batok, Nee Soon, and Tanjong Pagar GRCs, and the SMCs of Jurong Central, Jalan Kayu, and Radin Mas.

=== Commentary ===
Political observers interviewed by Channel NewsAsia (CNA) said that the opposition parties in the west should reassess their strategies due to the significant boundary changes. They anticipated that the opposition might find it challenging to build support in these redrawn constituencies. Bilveer Singh, an associate professor of political science from the National University of Singapore (NUS), noted that the establishment of some SMCs from traditional PAP strongholds might benefit the ruling party unless faced against a major opposition party. Eugene Tan, an associate professor of law from the Singapore Management University, said that while the smaller opposition parties might find SMCs easier to contest, multi-cornered fights could instead work against them. Chong Ja Ian from NUS also concurred that these new SMCs and some smaller GRCs might see more competition. Chong believed that the introduction of smaller SMCs and GRCs limits any political losses for the PAP.

Commentators from The Straits Times noted that the boundary changes could strengthen support for the ruling party in the newly formed GRCs in the west. This was because West Coast GRC and Bukit Batok SMC – both constituencies where opposition parties made significant gains in the last election – had been redrawn. Mustafa Izzuddin, a senior international affairs analyst at Solaris Strategies Singapore, felt that the PSP's chances of success in West Coast–Jurong West GRC have been "arguably reduced". Nevertheless, Gillian Koh, an Institute of Policy Studies senior research fellow, maintained that the EBRC's work was conducted "in a politically neutral fashion". Commentators expected a close fight in West Coast–Jurong West GRC, noting that the PAP's performance in the west also depended on the candidates it fielded.

Analysts on The Straits Times suggested that East Coast GRC could be highly competitive. The GRC incorporated the upper middle-class, better-educated voters from Joo Chiat, who might prioritise political pluralism and parliamentary checks and balances. Observers like Eugene Tan and Inderjit Singh noted that WP's candidate selection for East Coast could be a decisive factor, particularly if they fielded Pritam Singh, the Leader of the Opposition. On the other hand, analysts believed the PAP would have a stronger advantage in the newly renamed Marine Parade–Braddell Heights GRC, particularly with the inclusion of MacPherson SMC, a PAP stronghold. However, Teo Kay Key noted that MacPherson's 27,000 voters formed only a fraction of the GRC's 131,000 voters. The PAP's performance would also depend on how Manpower Minister Tan See Leng led the party's campaign in the district.

== See also ==
- List of defunct electoral divisions of Singapore
