= List of political parties in Singapore =

This is a list of political parties in Singapore, including existing and historical ones. The earliest political parties were established in the lead-up to Singapore first Legislative Council elections in 1948. Singapore is a republic. While the country has a multi-party system, the dominant political party have often been the People's Action Party since 1965, along with the main opposition party, the Workers' Party. Minority governments are uncommon, as elections have not resulted in a hung parliament since independence.

Legislative power is vested in parliament, which consists of the president as its head and a single chamber whose members are elected by popular vote. The role of the president as the head of state has been, historically, largely ceremonial although the constitution was amended in 1991 to give the president some veto powers in a few key decisions such as the use of the national reserves, as well as the appointment of key judiciary, civil service and Singapore Armed Forces posts. They also exercise powers over national security matters.

== History ==
=== Pre-independence ===
Amongst the oldest parties, the Malay Union, traced its history back to 14 May 1926, was initially a non-political association as the party only participated in the 1955 election. The Progressive Party and Labour Party, both established in the late 1940s, were some of the pioneering local establishments, with the PP the only party to contest in the first elections in 1948, and the LP coming on board in 1951. By 1955, the fledgling British colony had seven parties contesting, and reached a pinnacle of 13 parties in 1959. A total of three parties were established in the 1940s, 12 in the 1950s and five in the 1960s.

=== Post-independence ===
==== 20th century ====
Post-independence Singapore saw the dominance of the People's Action Party, which first came into power in 1959. On 16 May 1960, a new Societies Ordinance was passed, and in December 1966, local parties were forbidden from being affiliated to foreign ones. This directly impacted the handful of small parties with links to Malaysia, most of which renamed themselves and/or cut formal foreign ties. The PAP's dominance stemming from Singapore's economic advancement further weakened the smaller opposition parties, with a majority of Singaporeans voting for the PAP in subsequent elections.

Still, new parties continued to be established, and to date, there are therefore a total of 30 registered political parties today, of which ten have never contested in an election, 13 parties have officially dissolved with most through mergers with other parties. A few opposition parties, those of Workers' Party and Singapore Democratic Party, had gained some success towards the 80s with the captures of its safe seat of Hougang and Potong Pasir respectively, with the former went with further success heading towards the 21st century.

==== 21st century ====
Over the years, alliances between political parties existed, however short-lived. Presently, three functioning multi-party alliances were formed, with the oldest surviving political umbrella being the Singapore Democratic Alliance, which was formed on 3 July 2001, initially composed of the Singapore People's Party (SPP), National Solidarity Party (NSP), Pertubuhan Kebangsaan Melayu Singapura and the Justice Party, Singapore, with the SPP being the lead party. The vision was to bring all opposition parties under one banner to counter the PAP's dominance, but it was met with limited success due to opposition infighting. The NSP left the alliance in 2007, and in 2010, the SPP itself left when there was internal disagreements over the SPP's attempts to bring in the newly formed Reform Party (RP).

Many party members have resigned from its former parties and later formed newer parties over the years following the aftermath of its respective general elections, notably People's Power Party (PPP) formed by former WP and NSP member Goh Meng Seng in 2015, the Peoples Voice (PV) by former-National Solidarity Party's Secretary general Lim Tean in 2018, the Progress Singapore Party (PSP) in 2019 by former People's Action Party Member of Parliament Tan Cheng Bock, Red Dot United (RDU) in 2020 by former PSP members Ravi Philemon and Michelle Lee, and Singapore United Party (SUP) by former RP members in 2021.

Talks on a formation of alliance sparked prior to the 2020 election when four parties, Singaporeans First, PPP, RP and DPP, planned to create one alliance of their own, but ended up applying for the SDA on 1 April and has never materialized after SingFirst was dissolved and DPP withdrew from participating in that election. Two other political umbrellas were formed over a span of four months in 2023. In June 2024, People's Alliance for Reform (PAR) was established from the parties of PV, RP, PPP and DPP, though PPP later withdrew from the party months later prior to the 2025 election, followed by RP months after the 2025 election. In October 2024, The Coalition was established with SPP, National Solidarity Party (NSP), Red Dot United (RDU) and Singapore United Party (SUP), though the alliance has yet to be officialized.

== Legislation ==
Under the current legislation, all political parties (termed "Political Associations") must be registered under the Societies Act. As such, the following rules pertaining to political associations apply:

- All members of political parties must be Singaporean citizens.
- Political Association must not be affiliated or connected with any organisation outside Singapore. The fact that a political association uses a name or symbol which is the same as that of an organisation outside Singapore shall be deemed to be sufficient evidence that the political association has an affiliation or connection with that organisation.

The government has the power to dissolve the party if it contravenes the above rules, or any other rule applicable to all forms of registered societies.

Under the Political Donations Act which came into force on 15 February 2001, Political Associations are also barred from accepting any donation in cash or kind from impermissible donors, or from anonymous donors where the value exceeds S$5,000. The government announced that it was to "prevent foreigners from interfering in domestic politics through the financial support for any association's cause", and cited an example of a case in 1959 when S$700,000 was sent to Chew Swee Kee, then Education Minister from the Singapore People's Alliance by a "neighbouring intelligence service in a "black operation" against the interests of Singapore". Another case was also cited pertaining to foreign financial support for Francis Seow of the Workers' Party in 1988.

The People's Action Party donated $20,000 to Australian political parties through (Singtel-owned) Optus in 2010, although the motives and details of the donation remain unverified.

== Political parties ==
There have been a total of 43 political parties (not including Malaysia's parties, those contested in both Malaysia and Singapore elections, or those which contested during Singapore's merger with Malaysia) in Singapore.

Party or Alliance active
Party or Alliance active, but collated to another party or alliance
Party or Alliance dissolved
Party or Alliance registered, but is yet to contest
Party or Alliance's status unknown

=== Current political parties ===
| Party | Abbr. | Founded | Registered | Leader | Elections Contested (Note: The tally does not include city council elections, by-elections, Malaysian parliamentary elections or presidential elections (the latter which requires nonpartisan candidacy).) | Vote share | MPs (Note: The tally is based on the latest number of MPs, NCMPs, and NMPs of Parliament.) |
|---|---|---|---|---|---|---|---|
| People's Action Party; Parti Tindakan Rakyat 人民行动党 மக்களின் செயல் கட்சி | PAP | 21 Nov 1954 | 18 Feb 1961 | Lawrence Wong | 17 (1955, 1959, 1963, 1968, 1972, 1976, 1980, 1984, 1988, 1991, 1997, 2001, 2006, 2011, 2015, 2020, 2025) | 65.6% | 86 / 99 |
| Workers' Party; Parti Pekerja 工人党 பாட்டாளிக் கட்சி | WP | 3 Nov 1957 | 30 Jan 1961 | Pritam Singh | 16 (1959, 1963, 1968, 1972, 1976, 1980, 1984, 1988, 1991, 1997, 2001, 2006, 2011, 2015, 2020, 2025) | 15.0% | 12 / 99 |
| Progress Singapore Party; Parti Kemajuan Singapura 新加坡前进党 சிங்கப்பூர் முன்னேற்றக் கட்சி | PSP | 18 Jan 2019 | 28 Mar 2019 | Leong Mun Wai | 2 (2020, 2025) | 4.9% | 0 / 99 |
| Singapore Democratic Party; Parti Demokratik Singapura 新加坡民主党 சிங்கப்பூர் மக்களாட்சி | SDP | 6 Aug 1980 | 8 Sep 1980 | Chee Soon Juan | 11 (1980, 1984, 1988, 1991, 1997, 2001, 2006, 2011, 2015, 2020, 2025) | 3.7% | 0 / 99 |
| National Solidarity Party; Parti Perpaduan Nasional 国民团结党 தேசிய ஒருமைப்பாட்டுக் கட்சி | NSP | 6 Mar 1987 | | Spencer Ng | 9 (1988, 1991, 1997, 2001, (Note: The party was contested under the coalition of Singapore Democratic Alliance (SDA).) 2006, 2011, 2015, 2020, 2025) | 0.1% | 0 / 99 |
| Singapore People's Party; Parti Rakyat Singapura 新加坡人民党 சிங்கப்பூர் மக்கள் கட்சி | SPP | 21 Nov 1994 | | Steve Chia | 7 (1997, 2001}, 2006, 2011, 2015, 2020, 2025) | 1.2% | 0 / 99 |
| Singapore Democratic Alliance; Perikatan Demokratik Singapura 新加坡民主联盟 சிங்கப்பூர் ஜனநாயக கூட்டணி | SDA | 3 Jul 2001 | | Desmond Lim | 6 (2001, 2006, 2011, 2015, 2020, 2025) | 1.2% | 0 / 99 |
| Red Dot United; Titik Merah Bersatu 红点同心党 ஒன்றுபட்ட சிவப்புப் புள்ளி | RDU | 26 May 2020 | 15 Jun 2020 | Ravi Philemon | 2 (2020, 2025) | 4% | 0 / 99 |
| People's Power Party; Parti Kuasa Rakyat 人民力量党 மக்கள் சக்தி கட்சி | PPP | 15 May 2015 | | Goh Meng Seng | 3 (2015, 2020, 2025) | 0.7% | 0 / 99 |
| Peoples Voice; Suara Rakyat 人民之声 மக்கள் குரல் | PV | 29 Oct 2018 | | Lim Tean | 2 (2020, 2025 (Note: The party was contested under the coalition of People's Alliance for Reform (PAR).)) | | 0 / 99 |
| Reform Party; Parti Reformasi 革新党 சீர்திருத்தக் கட்சி | RP | 3 Jul 2008 | | Mahaboob Batsha | 4 (2011, 2015, 2020, 2025) | | 0 / 99 |
| Democratic Progressive Party; Parti Demokratik Progresif 民主进步党 ஜனநாயக முற்போக்குக் கட்சி | DPP | 16 Mar 1973 | | Mohamad Hamim bin Aliyas | 6 (1976, 1980, 1984, 1997, 2015, (Note: The party was contested under the coalition of Singapore People's Party (SPP).) 2025) | | 0 / 99 |
| Singapore Justice Party; Parti Keadilan Singapura 新加坡正义党 சிங்கப்பூர் நீதிக் கட்சி | SJP | 10 Aug 1972 | | Desmond Lim | 11 (1976, 1980, 1984, 1988, 1991, 2001, 2006, 2011, 2015, 2020, 2025) | | 0 / 99 |
| Singapore Malay National Organisation; Pertubuhan Kebangsaan Melayu Singapura 新加坡马来国民机构 | PKMS | 23 Dec 1951 | 20 Feb 1961 | Abu Mohamed | 14 (1955, 1959, 1972, 1976, 1980, 1984, 1988, 1991, 2001, 2006, 2011, 2015, 2020, 2025) | | 0 / 99 |
| People's Alliance for Reform; Perikatan Rakyat bagi Pembaharuan 人民改革联盟 பிரஜைச் சீர்திருத்தக் கூட்டணி | PAR | 1 Jun 2023 | 7 Dec 2023 | Lim Tean | 1 (2025) | 2.5% | 0 / 99 |
| Singapore United Party; Parti Bersatu Singapura 新加坡统一党 சிங்கப்பூர் ஐக்கியக் கட்சி | SUP | 24 Dec 2020 | | Andy Zhu | 1 (2025) | 0.7% | 0 / 99 |
| Most Valuable Party; Parti Paling Berharga 超值党 | MVP | 18 Dec 2025 | | Chia Yun Kai | | | 0 / 99 |

=== Shirt colours and logos ===
The candidates and supporters of the various political parties tend to wear the following shirt colours while making their rounds in various wards or campaigning.

| Party | Shirt Colour | Symbol |
|---|---|---|
| People's Action Party | White | Thunderbolt |
| Workers' Party | Light Blue | Hammer |
| Progress Singapore Party | Red; White | Palm tree |
| Singapore Democratic Party | Red | Up arrow with Rings |
| National Solidarity Party | Orange | Eight-pointed Star |
| Peoples Voice | Black | Ring with flower |
| Reform Party | Yellow | Sun |
| Singapore People's Party | White; Red | Star with SPP |
| Singapore Democratic Alliance | Blue | Star with four interlocking rings |
| Red Dot United | Navy Blue | Compass |
| People's Power Party | Light Purple | Torch |
| Democratic Progressive Party | White; Orange | Circle with pointed chords |
| People's Alliance for Reform | Maroon | Six person holding hands |
| Singapore United Party | Blue Grey | Lion |

=== Past political parties ===
| Party | Abbr. | Other name(s) & chronology | Registered (UEN) | Active period | Founder | Elections Contested |
|---|---|---|---|---|---|---|
| Barisan Sosialis (Note: The party may have ceased to exist as of 11 August 2025 and de-registered under Societies Act.) 社会主义阵线) | BS | Split faction from PAP | 13 Aug 1961 | 29 Jul 1961 - 1988 | Lee Siew Choh; Lim Chin Siong | 5 (1963, 1972, 1976, 1980, 1984) |
| Progressive Party 进步党; Parti Progresif | PP | Succeeded by LSP | - | 25 Aug 1947 - 10 May 1956 | Tan Chye Cheng; John Laycock; Nazir Ahmad Mallal | 3 (1948, 1951, 1955) |
| Malay Union 新加坡马来人联合会; Kesatuan Melayu Singapura | KMS | - | - | 14 May 1926 - 1961 | Ishak bin Ahmad | 2 (1955, 1959) |
| Labour Front 劳工阵线; Barisan Buroh | SLF | Preceded by LP | - | 21 Aug 1954 - 28 Feb 1960 | David Marshall; Lim Yew Hock; Francis Thomas | 2 (1955, 1959) |
| Singaporeans First 国人为先; Warga Diutamakan | SGF | - | 19 Aug 2014 | 25 May 2014 - 25 Jun 2020 | Tan Jee Say | 1 (2015) |
| Singapore People's Alliance 新加坡人民联盟; Perikatan Rakyat Singapura | SPA | Split faction from SLF, collated by SA | - | 10 Nov 1958 - 16 May 1965 | Lim Yew Hock | 1 (1959) |
| Liberal Socialist Party 自由社会党; Parti Liberal Sosialis | LSP | Preceded by PP and DP, succeeded by SPA | 24 May 1961 | 5 Feb 1956 - 10 Sep 1963 | E.K. Tan | 1 (1959) |
| Citizens' Party 公民党; Parti Warganegara | CP | Succeeded by WP | - | 25 Feb 1959 - 13 Sep 1960 | Seah Peng Chuan | 1 (1959) |
| Katong United Residents' Association 加东居民统一工会; Persatuan Penduduk Bersatu Katong | KURA | Split faction from LSP | - | 11 Jan 1959 - 23 Jun 1960 | Felice Leon-Soh | 1 (1959) |
| Democratic Party 民主党; Parti Demokratik | DP | Succeeded by LSP | - | 11 Feb 1955 - 5 Feb 1956 | Tan Eng Joo | 1 (1955) |
| Labour Party 劳工党; Parti Buroh | LP | Succeeded by SLF, affiliated: Singapore Socialist Party | - | 23 Mar 1948 - 1961 | M.A. Majid; M.P.D. Nair; Peter Williams | 1 (1951) |
| Singapore Congress 新加坡国民大会党; Kongres Singapura | SC | Succeeded by LSP | - | 9 May 1960 - 29 Jan 1962 | Felice Leon-Soh | 0 |
| United People's Front 人民联合阵线; Barisan Rakyat Bersatu | UPF | - | 21 Mar 1975 (S75SS0028F) | 21 Mar 1975 - | Harbans Singh | 4 (1976, 1980, 1984, 1988) |
| Angkatan Islam; Islamic Movement 回教阵线 | AI | Pan-Malayan Islamic Party, Persatuan Islam Setanah Melayu (1958–1967) | 6 Aug 1958 (S58SS0006B) | 6 Aug 1958 - | - | 4 (1959, 1963, 1984, 1988) |
| Singapore Chinese Party 新加坡华人党; Parti Cina Singapura | MCA | Malayan Chinese Association (1950–1967), collated by SA | 26 Sep 1950 (S50SS0003G) | 26 Sep 1950 - | - | 3 (1955, 1959, 1972 (Note: The party was contested under the coalition of United People's Front (UPF).)) |
| People's Front 人民阵线; Barisan Rakyat | - | Split faction from BS | 21 May 1971 (S71SS0037F) | 21 May 1971 - | - | 2 (1972, 1976) |
| Partai Rakyat; People's Party (Singapore State Division) 人民党 (新加坡州部); Partai Rakyat | PRSSD | - | 18 Jun 1962 (S56SS0008F) | 11 Nov 1955 - | Ahmad Boestamam | 2 (1959, 1963) |
| United National Front 联合国民阵线; Barisan Nasional Bersatu | UNF | - | 6 Mar 1970 (S70SS0008D) | 6 Mar 1970 - | - | 1 (1972) |
| Singapore Alliance Party 新加坡联盟党; Parti Perikatan Singapura | SA | Singapore Alliance, Perikatan Singapura (1963–1965), Alliance Party Singapura (from 1966) | 30 May 1963 (S66SS0019K) | 30 May 1963 - 17 Feb 1966 | Lim Yew Hock | 1 (1963) |
| Parti Kesatuan Ra'ayat; United Democratic Party 民主统一党 | - | - | 18 Jun 1962 (S62SS0078B) | 18 Jun 1962 - | - | 1 (1963) |
| United People's Party 人民团结党; Parti Rakyat Bersatu | UPP | - | 14 Jul 1961 (S61SS0187H) | 14 Jul 1961 - 1968 | Ong Eng Guan | 1 (1963) |
| Singapore Indian Congress 新加坡印度国民大会党; Kongres India Singapura | MIC, later SIC | Singapore Regional Indian Congress (1946–1953); Malayan Indian Congress (1953–1968), collated by SA | 7 Aug 1962 (S62SS0014K) | Aug 1946 - | - | 1 (1959) |
| United Singapore Democrats 团结新加坡民主党; Demokrat Singapura Bersatu | USD | Split faction from SDP | 25 Mar 2010 (T10SS0067B) | 25 Mar 2010 - | Jaslyn Go | 0 |
| Socialist Front 社会主义阵线; Socialist Front | SF | Split faction from RP | 1 Sep 2010 (T10SS0127F) | 1 Sep 2010 - | Chia Ti Lik | 0 |
| People's Liberal Democratic Party 人民自由民主党; Parti Liberal Demokratik Rakyat | - | - | 2 May 2006 (T06SS0103F) | 2 May 2006 - | Ooi Boon Ewe | 0 |
| Singapore National Front 新加坡国民阵线; Barisan Nasional Singapura | SNF | - | 15 Aug 1991 (S91SS0005E) | 15 Aug 1991 - | - | 0 |
| People's Republican Party 人民共和党; Partai Rakyat Republik | - | - | 30 Aug 1973 (S73SS0032C) | 30 Aug 1973 - | - | 0 |
| National Party of Singapore 新加坡国民党; Parti Nasional Singapura | - | - | 26 Feb 1971 (S71SS0003G) | 26 Feb 1971 - | - | 0 |
| Persatuan Melayu Singapura; Singapore Malay Association 新加坡马来人协会 | - | - | 2 Feb 1952 (S52SS0003F) | 2 Feb 1952 - | - | 0 |

=== Other defunct parties ===
- Malayan Communist Party
- Malayan Democratic Union (dissolved in 1948)

== See also ==
- Politics of Singapore
- Elections in Singapore
- List of political parties by country
- Non-constituency Member of Parliament
- Constituencies of Singapore
