= Goh Meng Seng =

Singaporean politician

- 吴明盛
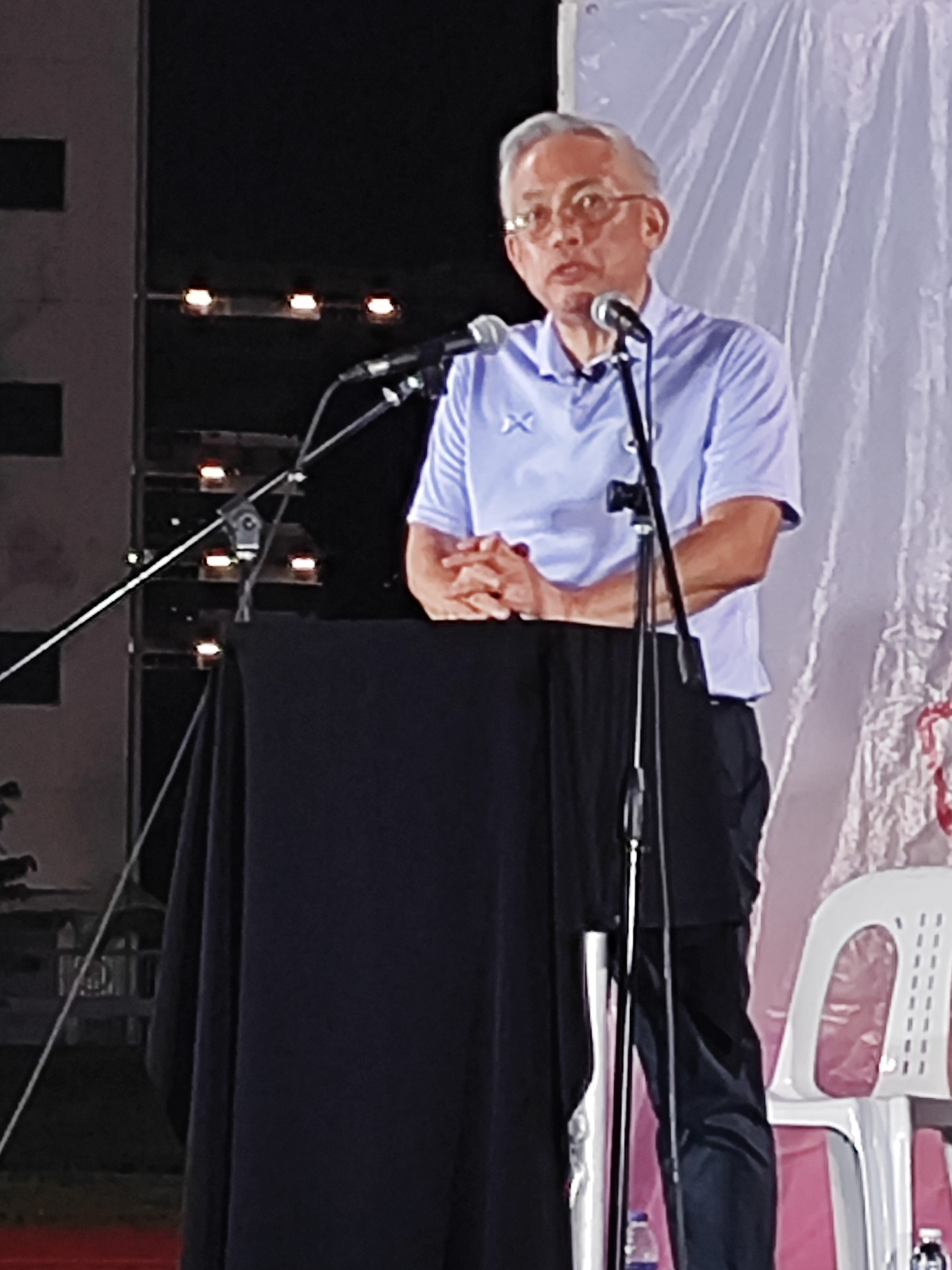
- Goh during a PPP rally speech at Yio Chu Kang Stadium in April 2025

1st Secretary-General of the People's Power Party
- In office 19 May 2015 – 6 July 2026
- Preceded by: Position established
- Succeeded by: William Lim

9th Secretary-General of the National Solidarity Party
- In office 2010–2011
- Preceded by: Steve Chia
- Succeeded by: Hazel Poa

Personal details
- Party: People's Power Party (2015-present)
- Other political affiliations: National Solidarity Party (2006-2011); Workers' Party (2006)
- Education: National University of Singapore
- Occupation: Politician

Goh Meng Seng (Note: simplified Chinese: 吴明盛; traditional Chinese: 吳明盛; pinyin: Wú Míngshèng; HTS: Ghou^{2} Meng^{2}seng^{2}) is a Singaporean politician who served as the secretary-general of the People's Power Party (PPP) from 2015 to 2026.

== Education ==
Goh was educated at River Valley High School and Hwa Chong Junior College, before going on to the National University of Singapore where he completed a Bachelor of Arts and Bachelor of Social Science (Honours) in Economics.

== Political career ==
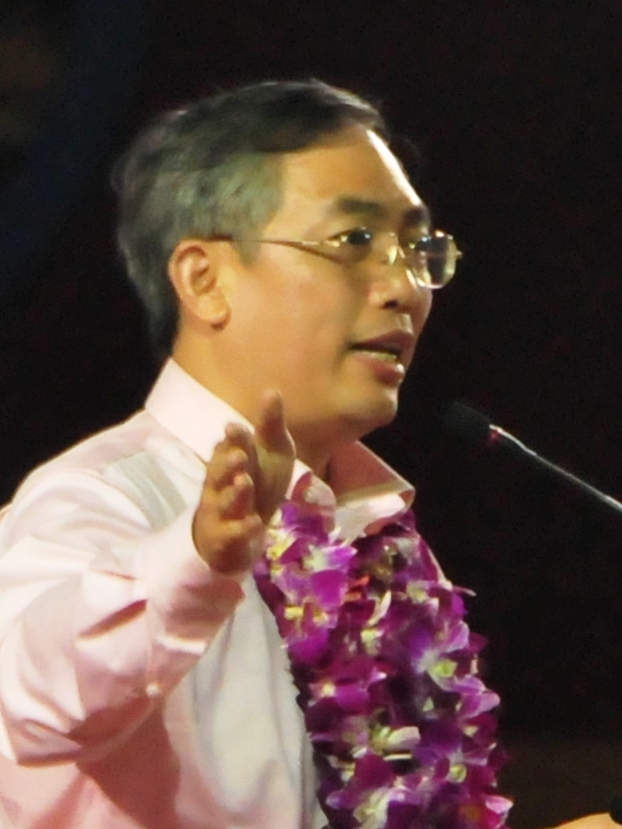
Goh in 2011 as an NSP candidate

=== Entry into politics/WP era ===
Goh contested in the 2006 general election in Aljunied Group Representation Constituency (GRC) as part of a five-member team for the Workers' Party (WP) challenging the governing People's Action Party (PAP); the WP team garnered 43.91% of the vote. This being the best losing opposition performance in the general election, they had to nominate a member amongst themselves to accept the only Non-constituency Member of Parliament (NCMP) seat at the election; the opposition had already been elected in two of its three minimum seats. Sylvia Lim eventually accepted the seat.

Goh later left the WP in the same year after claiming responsibility for Internet posts detrimental to the reputation of the party; this was despite his membership of the party's central executive committee (CEC) and its Aljunied "A team". He later joined the National Solidarity Party (NSP) and became its secretary-general.

=== NSP era ===
For the 2011 general election, Goh contested in Tampines GRC, leading a five-member team against the PAP, whose team was led by anchor minister Mah Bow Tan; the NSP received 42.78% of the vote.

In June of the same year, Goh stepped down from his post as secretary-general of NSP "for a breather and to take stock of his future"; he went into partisan political sabbatical to help presidential hopeful Tan Kin Lian in his bid for the presidency. Goh did not contest for any position in the NSP's 14th central executive committee thereafter. He would eventually announce his departure from the party at the end of the same year.

After the 2011 election, Goh shuttled around Asia for his consultancy business, from which he continued his political contribution mostly in the form of Facebook postings of political critiques. In a post, Goh courted controversy by suggesting that the NSP could "[exact] revenge" on the WP by contesting Hougang Single Member Constituency (SMC) in the 2012 by-election for the constituency, after incumbent Yaw Shin Leong was expelled from the WP for an extramarital affair.

=== Creation of PPP ===
In May 2015, a few months before the general election in the same year, Goh announced that he was setting up a new political party; he called it the People's Power Party. The application for the PPP's creation was officially approved in July 2015. Goh cited the death of Lee Kuan Yew as a reason for creating the party, saying that without Lee's presence, "[there was] no one else who [had] such a strong political morality who [could] control everyone", and that checks and balances were only possible with separation of powers among governmental institutions and more robust and diverse representation in Parliament.

PPP entered the 2015 general election as the youngest party; the only constituency it contested was the four-seat Chua Chu Kang GRC. The party garnered 23.11% of the vote against the PAP.

In the 2020 general election, Goh challenged PAP incumbent Tin Pei Ling in MacPherson SMC; he claimed that it would be the last election he entered. He subsequently lost the contest with 28.26% of the vote.

In December 2021, during the COVID-19 pandemic, Goh was issued a correction direction per the Protection from Online Falsehoods and Manipulation Act 2019 (POFMA) for claiming that the viruses HIV and SARS-CoV-2 (the latter being the source of COVID-19), from unrelated families, could combine; and for discouraging people from taking the COVID-19 vaccine, which he had deemed "totally useless" against the Omicron variant of SARS-CoV-2. On 14 October 2022, Goh was issued another POFMA direction for saying that the SARS-CoV-2 XBB variant led to a more common and severe COVID-19 and that the dead were piling up in mortuaries, funeral parlours, and crematoriums.

In June 2023, Goh was appointed organising secretary for the new political alliance People's Alliance for Reform (PAR), comprising Peoples Voice (PV), the Reform Party (RP), his PPP, and the Democratic Progressive Party (DPP); it was formed to contest the upcoming general election, which would eventually be held in 2025. On 22 February 2025, Goh withdrew PPP from PAR citing "irreconcilable strategic differences"; The Straits Times attributed the withdrawal to the PPP's continued opposition to the COVID-19 vaccine and desire to contest Tampines GRC, which made a four-way fight possible.

PPP eventually fielded a team to contest the GRC in a four-way fight with the PAP, NSP and WP. Besides Tampines, the party had also entered a three-way fight in Ang Mo Kio GRC with the PAP and the Singapore United Party (SUP). Shortly after nominations ended and while campaigning, Goh criticised the WP for entering their first contest in Tampines GRC instead of contesting Marine Parade–Braddell Heights GRC. The WP had opted out of contesting there at the last minute, resulting in the PAP team being elected via a walkover.

In the 2025 general election, all PPP candidates lost their election deposits of S$13,500 per candidate for not reaching the 12.5% vote threshold to have them returned, having received 0.43% of the vote in Tampines GRC and 10.2% in Ang Mo Kio GRC. With the release of the results, Goh was reportedly demoralized, having sold his property to finance the PPP's campaign, and stated that he did not plan to return to politics until he amassed enough money.

In June 2026, Goh stepped down as secretary-general.

== Personal life ==
Goh is a Chinese Singaporean of Hainanese descent. His elder brother, who had been the principal election agent of the NSP for the 2011 general election, died of a heart attack while sleeping on the night of 27 April 2011.
