= The Coalition (Singapore) =

Singaporean political alliance

- Malay name: Pakatan itu
- Chinese name: 联盟
- Leader: Mohd Ridzwan Mohammad; Steve Chia; Andy Zhu
- Founders: Ravi Philemon; Mohd Ridzwan Mohammad; Steve Chia; Andy Zhu
- Founded: 28 October 2023; 2 years ago
- Parliament: 0 / 104

The Coalition is an informal political alliance in Singapore consisting of National Solidarity Party, Singapore People's Party and Singapore United Party. It was formed in October 2023.

The alliance had no dominant party or leader but the Red Dot United, a previous component party, served as the secretariat for administrative purposes.

On 12 April 2025, RDU withdrew from the Coalition, citing concerns over other member parties' lack of commitment to avoiding three-cornered fights.

== Ideology ==
The alliance sought to provide checks and balances and reduce two-thirds majority held by the People's Action Party in the government. Its manifesto will likely focus on bread-and-butter issues, including inflation, cost of living and wages.

== Member parties ==
Name		Leader(s)	Seats contested	Votes (%)
NSP	National Solidarity Party	Reno Fong	10	0.13
SPP	Singapore People's Party	Steve Chia	5	1.18
SUP	Singapore United Party	Andy Zhu	5	0.66

== Former member parties ==
Name		Leader(s)	Left
RDU	Red Dot United	Ravi Philemon	12 April 2025

== Electoral history ==
Election	Leader	Votes	%	Seats					NCMPs	Position	Result
Election	Leader	Votes	%	Contested			Total	+/–	NCMPs	Position	Result
Election	Leader	Votes	%	Seats	Won	Lost	Total	+/–	NCMPs	Position	Result
2025	Mohd Ridzwan Mohammad; Steve Chia; Andy Zhu	46,961	1.96%	20	0	20	0 / 97	Steady	0 / 2	▲7th	No seats

== See also ==
- Elections in Singapore
- List of political parties in Singapore
- Politics of Singapore
