= Spencer Ng =

Singaporean politician

- 黄俊宏
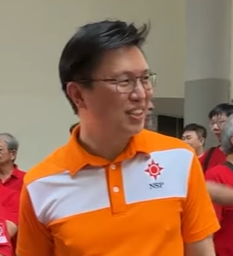
- Ng at a NSP walkabout in Sembawang on 6 Apr 2025

15th Secretary-General of the National Solidarity Party
- Incumbent
- Assumed office 2017
- Preceded by: Lim Tean

Personal details
- Born: 16 September 1979 (age 47) Singapore
- Party: National Solidarity Party
- Occupation: Politician

Spencer Ng Chung Hon (Chinese: 黄俊宏; pinyin: Huáng Jùnhóng; born 16 September 1979) is a Singaporean politician who has been the secretary-general of the National Solidarity Party (NSP) since 2017.

A former school teacher, Ng made his electoral debut in the 2011 Singaporean general election when he joined a five-member NSP team to contest Marine Parade GRC against a five-member team from the governing People's Action Party (PAP). The NSP team lost with 43.35% against the PAP's 56.65%. Since then, Ng has led NSP teams to contest in 2015, 2020 and 2025 in Sembawang GRC and has lost all three times.

== Early life ==
Ng holds a degree in Arts and Social Sciences from the National University of Singapore, majoring in History and Sociology. He also holds a post-graduate education diploma from the National Institute of Education.

== Political career ==
Ng joined the Ministry of Education in July 2003 and left teaching in 2007. He has been an entrepreneur in the entertainment and event industries since 2007. He is also a business consultant active in helping local businesses and start-ups. In the 2011 general election, it was announced that Ng would contest Marine Parade GRC as a NSP candidate. Days before nomination day, a former part time teacher of Ng accused him of inappropriate behaviour, claiming that he had "tried to kiss a student on the lips". Ng replied that he had given his side of the story and election is to focus on country and people's issues. Eventually, the NSP team lost with 43.35% of the vote against the PAP's 56.65%.

In the 2015 general election, Ng led a NSP team to contest Sembawang GRC. The NSP team lost with 27.72% of the vote against the PAP's 72.28%.

In 2017, Ng took over as Secretary-General of the NSP following Lim Tean's resignation.

In the 2020 general election, Ng led the NSP and contested in Sembawang GRC. The NSP team lost with an improved 32.71% of the vote against the PAP's 67.29%.

In 2024, Ng formed The Coalition with SPP leader Steve Chia, SUP leader Andy Zhu and RDU leader Ravi Philemon.

In the 2025 general election, Ng led a NSP team in Sembawang GRC, this time against the SDP and the PAP. When speaking about negotiations with the SDP, Ng used the analogy of SDP viewing the trading of constituencies as trading spouses, leading to widespread controversy. Ng's team lost their deposit, receiving 2.32% of the vote. The SDP received 29.93% and the PAP 67.75%.
