= Lim Tean =

Singaporean lawyer and politician

- 林鼎
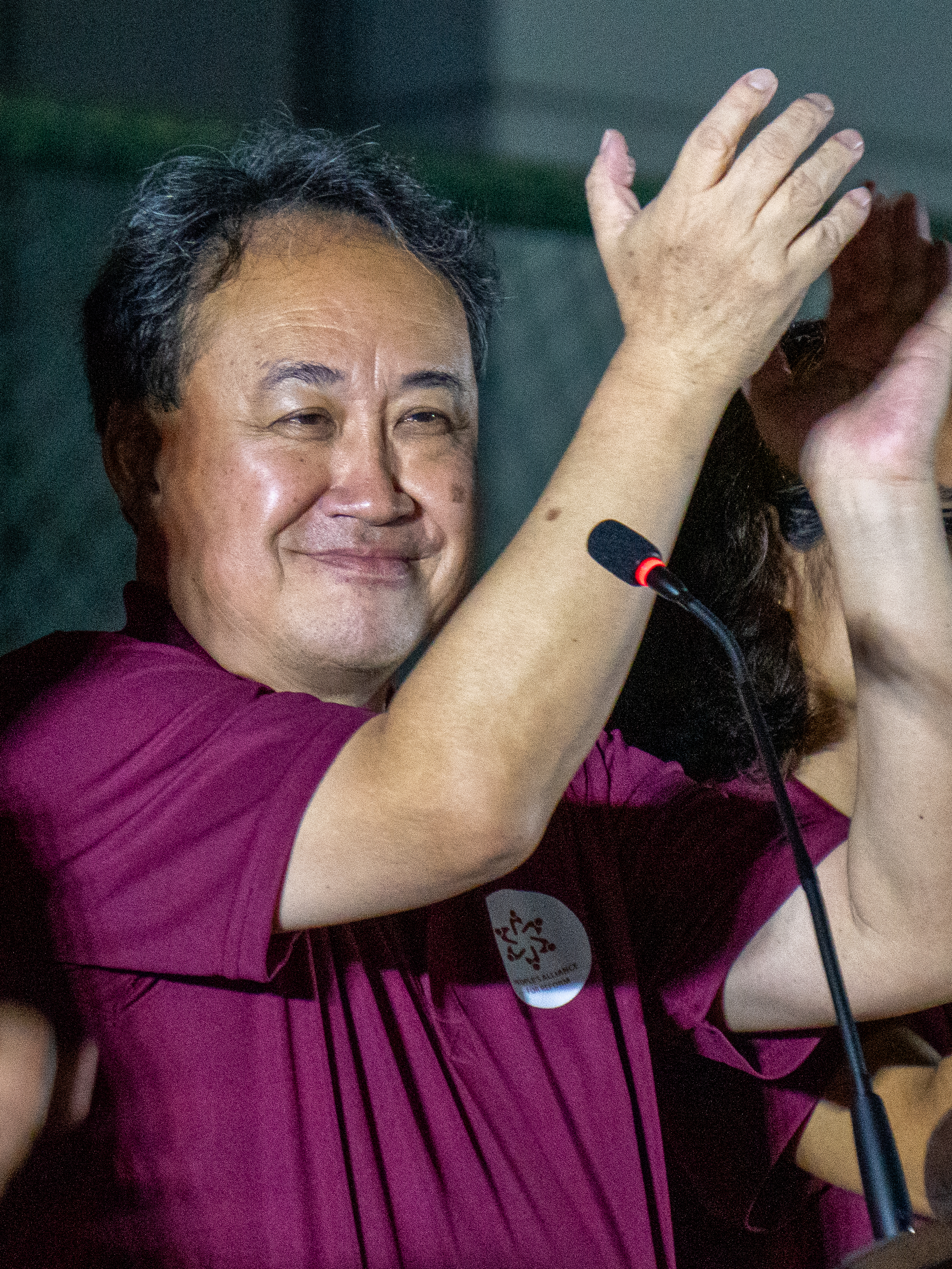
- Lim in 2025

1st Secretary-General of the People's Alliance for Reform
- In office 29 October 2023 – 6 August 2026
- Preceded by: Position established

1st Secretary-General of the Peoples Voice
- In office 29 October 2018 – 6 August 2026
- Preceded by: Position established

5th Secretary-General of the National Solidarity Party
- In office 30 August 2015 – 18 May 2017
- Preceded by: Jeannette Chong-Aruldoss
- Succeeded by: Spencer Ng

Personal details
- Born: 17 November 1964 (age 62) Singapore
- Other political affiliations: People's Alliance for Reform (2023–2026); Peoples Voice (2018–2026); National Solidarity Party (2011–2017)
- Education: Hwa Chong Junior College; University of Reading (LLB); Gonville and Caius College, Cambridge (LLM)
- Occupation: Lawyer; politician

Lim Tean (IPA: /tjɛn/ TYEN; Chinese: 林鼎; pinyin: Lín Dǐng; Pe̍h-ōe-jī: Lîm Téng; born 17 November 1964) is a Singaporean lawyer and politician. He is the founder of the political party Peoples Voice (PV) and a co-founder of the political alliance People's Alliance for Reform (PAR), which includes PV, and has been the secretary-general of both since their respective creations in 2018 and 2023. He had previously been the secretary-general of the National Solidarity Party (NSP) between 2015 and 2017.

== Early life ==
Lim was born in 1964 as the eldest son of Lim Chin Teong, a senior civil servant who served as Chief Executive Director of the People's Association (PA) between the late 1970s and early 1980s. His mother, Aw Eng Lian, was a Chinese-language teacher at Zhonghua Girls School for over 40 years. Both his parents graduated from Nanyang University, currently Nanyang Technological University.

At the age of seven, Lim enrolled into Montfort Junior School for his primary education but was disrupted after his father accepted a posting by the Singapore Government as First Secretary in Singapore's mission to the Soviet Union, and Lim travelled with his family to live in Moscow.

== Legal career ==
In 1985, Lim went to England to study law at the University of Reading. He was conferred a LLB in 1988 and resided in London as a qualified barrister at the Middle Temple.

Concurrently in 2007, Lim took a sabbatical from the legal practice to explore the business world. He founded an Indonesian mining company based out of Sulawesi. His mining company became the first company to produce and ship iron-ore from the island. In 2017, Lim returned to Singapore and founded his law firm Carson Law Chambers.

=== Defamation trial between Leong Sze Hian and Lee Hsien Loong ===
Lim represented anti-government critic and blogger Leong Sze Hian in a defamation case brought by Singapore Prime Minister Lee Hsien Loong on 8 December 2018. A cross-examination of Lee was held from 6 to 9 October 2020.

The trial began with the cross examination of Lee on 6 October. It lasted for 5 hours. On the second day of the trial an expert witness named Dr Phan Tuan Quang from the Hong Kong University Business School for the Plaintiff was cross examined. This too lasted for slightly over 5 hours. The trial ended when Lim argued that there was "no case to submit" before Leong was scheduled to take the stand to be cross-examined. The closing written submissions was due on 30 November 2020 and it had been agreed that these would not exceed 200 pages. In March 2021, the High Court ordered for Leong to pay Lee $133,000, which Lim called "a wrong and deeply flawed" decision.

=== Conduct issues ===
On 2 October 2020, Lim was arrested after he refused to cooperate with the police by not turning for a compulsory police interview scheduled on 28 September, of which could be rescheduled, and not intending to be interviewed. He was suspected for alleged criminal breach of trust, in which a former client reported him for allegedly misappropriating a sum of money awarded to him as damages by the court. He was also suspected of unlawful stalking, in which a former female employee alleged harassment from him while being employed in his law firm. The arrest was carried out while Lim was preparing with Leong for an upcoming cross-examination of Lee in the defamation lawsuit. Lim alleged that the investigations were politically motivated, which the police refuted, stating that it had a duty to investigate the allegations. Leong later posted bail for Lim.

Lim sought for a judicial review to discontinue investigations into him by the authorities, however it was dismissed by a judge on 8 December 2020, stating that the application was "utterly devoid of any legal merit whatsoever". On 12 May 2022, Lim was charged on five counts in the courts for criminal breach of trust, unlawful stalking and acting as an advocate or solicitor without a valid practising certificate.

==== Improper conduct in handling client's money ====
Though a separate trial in 2020, the client had reclaimed the sum of S$30,000 from Lim. On 22 August 2023, Lim was found guilty of two charges of grossly improper conduct in handling the sum of the client. On 23 January 2026, the Law Society called for Lim to be struck off the roll. On April 10, 2026, Lim was fined S$30,000.

==== Practising without certificate ====
Between 1 April and 9 June 2021, Lim was practising without the required yearly practising certificate, and attended court hearings on behalf of his clients on 32 occasions. The practising certificate was only issued on 10 June 2021 after Lim paid the professional indemnity insurance required among other stipulations. Lim asserted that the certificate should have been backdated to 1 April. Lim was sentenced to six weeks’ jail and a fine of $1,000 on 17 February 2025 in the District Court. Lim appealed to the High Court against the conviction and sentence, while the prosecution appealed for a stiffer penalty. On 23 February 2026, the High Court found that the charge was one of strict liability, and enhanced Lim’s jail term to three months and a week after finding the district judge had erred in sentencing him. On 6 July, he was denied the ability to appeal again and ordered to begin his sentence on 20 July. This was later deferred to 3 August.

On 4 August, a warrant for his arrest was issued after he failed to surrender himself for his sentence. He was later arrested in Johor Bahru, Malaysia on 6 August by the Royal Malaysia Police, and was deported back to Singapore on 11 August. Two Singaporean men were charged for allegedly helping Lim to leave Singapore illegally.

== Political career ==
Lim first became involved in politics in 2011 when he joined the NSP. However, he remained relatively inactive within the party until 2015, when secretary-general Hazel Poa resigned, protesting the party's desire to contest MacPherson Single Member Constituency (SMC), which the Workers' Party (WP) had already targeted. One week before the 2015 general elections, the leadership of the NSP approached Lim, inviting him to serve as their acting secretary-general. Despite the relatively short time before the election, Lim accepted, becoming a candidate for Tampines Group Representation Constituency (GRC). receiving 24.9% of the votes cast. In May 2017, Lim resigned from his position, citing disagreements with the party.

In 2018, Lim together with other opposition leaders called for an alliance of Singaporean opposition parties, with Tan Cheng Bock being proposed as its leader. However, this failed to materialise. The call for a similar alliance was repeated before the general elections in 2020. On 29 October 2018, Lim announced the founding of a new political party headed by himself, calling it Peoples Voice (PV). During the 2020 general election, PV contested two GRCs and one SMC; Lim personally contested Jalan Besar GRC, being defeated by the governing People's Action Party (PAP) with 34.64% of the vote.

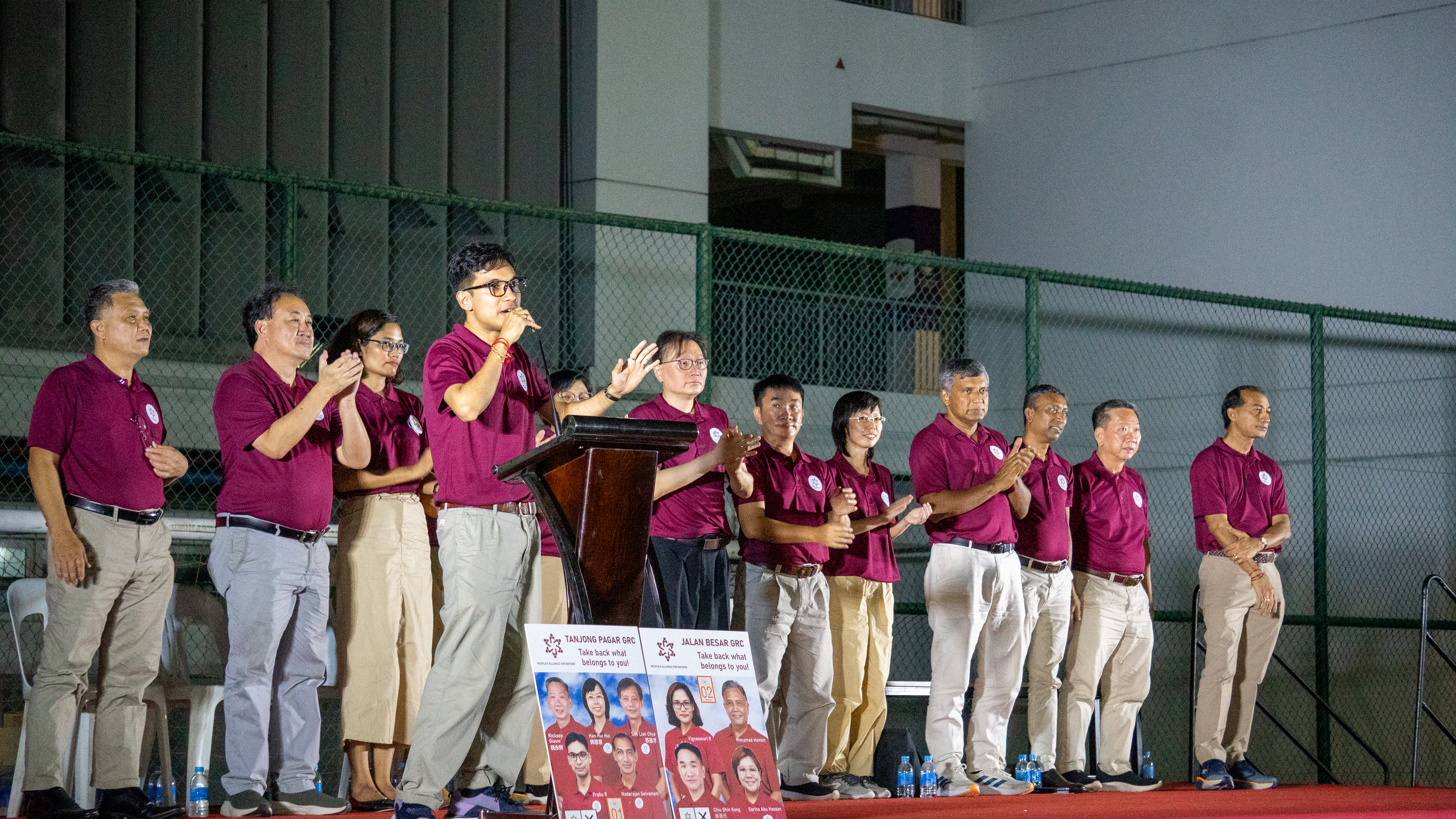
Lim (second from left) at a PAR rally during the 2025 general election

Leading up to the 2025 Singaporean general election, in 2023, Lim worked to form a four-party alliance, People's Alliance for Reform (PAR) to contest in the general election. The alliance initially consisted of Peoples Voice, Reform Party, People’s Power Party (PPP) and Democratic Progressive Party. However, People’s Power Party withdrew from the alliance in February 2025 as PPP insisted on contesting in Tampines GRC and also due to its differing stance on Singapore's COVID-19 vaccination programme, of which PPP had previously called for a suspension.

PAR would contest in six constituencies with thirteen candidates. Two of these constituencies, Radin Mas SMC and Potong Pasir SMC would be three-cornered fights against SPP and an independent candidate respectively. On Nomination Day, Lim was revealed to be PAR's candidate in Potong Pasir SMC, in a three-cornered fight against SPP candidate Williamson Lee and PAP candidate Alex Yeo. Throughout the campaign, Lim promised free education and healthcare if elected. However, Lim would lose his $13,500 deposit after receiving 8.35% of the votes against SPP's 22.47% and PAP's 69.18%.

== Litigation proceedings ==
=== Bankruptcy applications ===
In September 2013, a Chinese national, Huang Min, and Lim entered into an agreement in which Huang agreed to lend US$150,000 to Lim. However, their agreement was disputed over whether it was a loan or a deposit for the purchase of the iron ore mine. Lim appealed to the High Court but withdrew the appeal on 15 January 2019. A day later, he issued two cheques to settle the monies and legal costs, ahead of another hearing scheduled on 17 January 2019, and Huang withdrew the application.

An article by The Straits Times published on 22 June 2020 stated that Lim is involved in two bankruptcy applications from DBS Bank and Sing Wing (I & E), a trading company, totalling about S$1.45 million. A hearing for the application by Sing Wing (I & E) was scheduled on 16 July 2020, while there was no further details about DBS Bank's applications. In an interview with The Online Citizen, Lim denied the bankruptcy applications by DBS and Sing Wing, and said it was a smearing technique to damage his image by the mainstream media. Lim stated that he was not contacted by The Straits Times and that he was "not going to be bankrupted", and that the sum owed was "total rubbish".

On 10 April 2026, it was reported that Lim was declared bankrupt after a notice was published on the Gazette. Lim denied the bankruptcy, stated that he had settled with the petitioning creditor but the court order was not retracted.
