= Mohamad Hamim Aliyas =

Singaporean politician (born 1962/63)

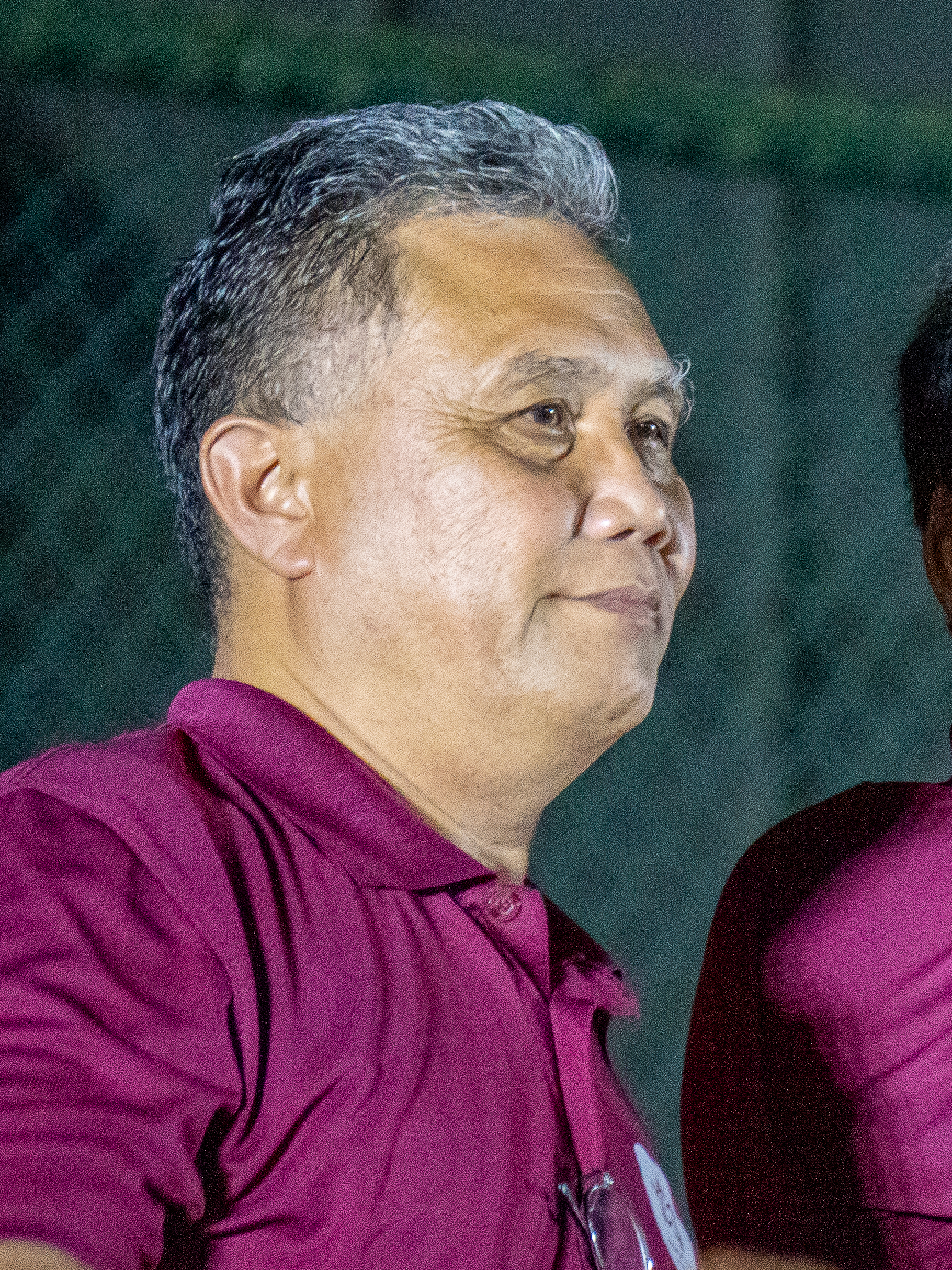
- Hamim in 2025

Secretary-General of the Democratic Progressive Party
- Incumbent
- Assumed office 19 February 2019

Personal details
- Born: Mohamad Hamim bin Aliyas; 1962 or 1963 (age 63–64) Singapore
- Party: Democratic Progressive Party (2011–2015, 2019–present)
- Other political affiliations: Singapore Democratic Alliance (2006–2011); Singapore People's Party (2011, 2015–2019)
- Occupation: Politician

Mohamad Hamim bin Aliyas (born 1962 or 1963) is a Singaporean businessman and politician. He is the secretary-general of the Democratic Progressive Party and the treasurer of the People's Alliance for Reform.

== Political career ==
In the 2006 general election, Hamim contested Pasir Ris-Punggol GRC as part of a 6 member SDA team. The team lost to the PAP, receiving 31.30% against the PAP's 68.70%.

In the 2011 general election, Hamim joined the SPP's star team in Bishan-Toa Payoh GRC led by Chiam See Tong. However, the team was defeated by the PAP team led by Deputy Prime Minister Wong Kan Seng. The SPP team received 43.07% of the vote against the PAP's 56.93%. After the election, Hamim left the SPP and joined the Democratic Progressive Party as the party's chairman.

In the 2015 general election, Hamim left the DPP to join a SPP team to contest Bishan-Toa Payoh GRC once again. The SPP team was defeated by the PAP 26.41% to 73.59%, and Hamim left the SPP to rejoin the DPP.

On 19 February 2019, DPP secretary-general Benjamin Pwee left the party to join the SDP for the 2020 general election, and Hamim became secretary-general of the DPP. Hamim and the DPP did not contest in the 2020 election, citing an interest in avoiding three cornered fights.

In 2023, Hamim led DPP to join the People's Alliance for Reform and was the only DPP candidate in the 2025 general election.
