= Peoples Voice (Singapore) =

Singaporean political party

Peoples Voice: Suara Rakyat (Malay); 人民之声 (Chinese); Rénmín Zhīshēng; மக்கள் குரல் (Tamil); Makkaḷ Kural
- Leader: Lim Tean
- Founder: Lim Tean
- Founded: 31 August 2018; 8 years ago
- Split from: National Solidarity Party
- Headquarters: 5C Goodwood Hill, Singapore 258904
- Ideology: Populism
- National affiliation: People's Alliance for Reform
- Colours: Black
- Parliament: 0 / 104

Website
- peoplesvoicesg.com (defunct)

Peoples Voice (PV) is a political party in Singapore. PV was founded in 2018 by Lim Tean after he left National Solidarity Party (NSP) in 2017.

== History ==
In 2017, Lim stepped down from his secretary-general position in NSP and left the party, citing fundamental differences with their approach to politics. He then founded PV which was officially registered on 31 October 2018 with the Registry of Societies. In March 2019, Leong Sze Hian was made the PV's shadow finance minister while Kok Ming Cheang was made the shadow health minister.

In the 2020 general election, which was called on 23 June with the dissolution of the 13th Parliament of Singapore, PV had put forward 10 candidates to contest Mountbatten Single Member Constituency (SMC), Jalan Besar, and Pasir Ris–Punggol Group Representation Constituencies (GRC), the latter of which was also the battleground for a three-cornered contest including the Singapore Democratic Alliance. Following the election on 10 July, the party won none of the contested seats. Their five-member team for Pasir Ris–Punggol GRC team had also lost a combined $67,500 election deposit (five times the deposit of $13,500 per candidate) for garnering only 12.18% of the votes, falling just 0.32% short of the one-eighth threshold (12.5%) in order to keep their deposit. In terms of vote share, they got 21.26% of the votes cast on all the constituencies contested, and 2.37% based on overall popular vote.

Leading up to the 2025 Singaporean general election, in 2023, Lim worked to form a four-party alliance, People's Alliance for Reform (PAR) to contest in the general election. The alliance initially consisted of Peoples Voice, Reform Party, People’s Power Party (PPP) and Democratic Progressive Party. However, People’s Power Party withdrew from the alliance in February 2025 as PPP insisted on contesting in Tampines GRC and also due to its differing stance on Singapore's COVID-19 vaccination programme, of which PPP had previously called for a suspension.

PAR would contest in six constituencies with thirteen candidates. On Nomination Day, Lim was revealed to be PAR's candidate in Potong Pasir SMC, in a three-cornered fight against Singapore People's Party candidate Williamson Lee and PAP candidate Alex Yeo. Throughout the campaign, Lim promised free education and healthcare if elected. However, Lim loset his $13,500 deposit after receiving 8.35% of the votes against SPP's 22.47% and PAP's 69.18%.

== Leadership ==
| No | Leader | Years |
|---|---|---|
| 1 | Lim Tean | 2020–2026 |

== Electoral performance ==
| Election | Leader | Votes | % | Seats | | | | | NCMPs | Position | Result |
| Election | Leader | Votes | % | Contested | | | Total | +/– | NCMPs | Position | Result |
| Election | Leader | Votes | % | Seats | Won | Lost | Total | +/– | NCMPs | Position | Result |
|---|---|---|---|---|---|---|---|---|---|---|---|
| 2020 | Lim Tean | 59,183 | 2.37% | 10 | 0 | 10 | 0 / 93 | Steady | 0 / 2 | ▲6th | No seats |

== See also ==
- Elections in Singapore
- List of political parties in Singapore
- Politics of Singapore
