= People's Alliance for Reform =

Singaporean political alliance

People's Alliance for Reform: Perikatan Rakyat bagi Pembaharuan (Malay); 人民改革联盟 (Chinese); பிரஜைச் சீர்திருத்தக் கூட்டணி (Tamil)
- Chairman: Mohamad Hamim bin Aliyas
- Secretary-General: Lim Tean
- Founders: Lim Tean; Kenneth Jeyaretnam; Goh Meng Seng; Mohamad Hamim bin Aliyas
- Founded: June 2023; 3 years ago
- Headquarters: 5C Goodwood Hill, Singapore 258904
- Ideology: Populism
- Colours: Brown
- Parliament: 0 / 104

Website
- https://sites.google.com/view/par-singapore

The People's Alliance for Reform (PAR) is a political alliance in Singapore comprising two extra-parliamentary parties, Peoples Voice (PV) and the Democratic Progressive Party (DPP). It was formed in June 2023. The PAR is commonly labelled a "mosquito party", a local expression for frivolous political parties in Singapore that attract little genuine backing, with their candidates and members often treated more as objects of mockery than as serious political contenders.

== History ==
=== 2023: Formation ===
In June 2023, Lim Tean, secretary-general of PV, announced the formation of a political alliance comprising PV, DPP, the Reform Party (RP), and the People's Power Party (PPP); it was named the People's Alliance for Reform. The four parties were to contest the upcoming 2025 general election as an alliance. Lim was appointed secretary-general of PAR, Kenneth Jeyaretnam, secretary-general of RP, was appointed chairperson, and Goh Meng Seng, secretary-general of PPP, was appointed organising secretary.

==== 2025: Withdrawal of PPP ====
On 22 February 2025, the PPP withdrew from the alliance due to "strategic differences" with the rest of the alliance, particularly regarding its opposition to the COVID-19 vaccine and desire to contest Tampines Group Representation Constituency (GRC). The latter point of contention, in particular, was opposed by the rest of the PAR due to its potential to create a four-cornered contest in Tampines GRC.

=== 2025 general election ===
After the Electoral Boundaries Review Committee released its report on 11 March 2025, Lim announced on Facebook that PAR planned to contest 10 constituencies: Jalan Kayu Single Member Constituency (SMC), Kebun Baru SMC, Marymount SMC, Mountbatten SMC, Potong Pasir SMC, Queenstown SMC, Radin Mas SMC, Yio Chu Kang SMC, Jalan Besar GRC and Tanjong Pagar GRC. It eventually contested in six constituencies: Jalan Besar GRC, Tanjong Pagar GRC, Potong Pasir SMC, Queenstown SMC, Radin Mas SMC and Yio Chu Kang SMC.

The PAR failed to win any constituency; it also lost its election deposits in Potong Pasir and Radin Mas SMCs as it failed to garner at least 12.5% of the vote there. The biggest constituency-level share of the vote for the governing People's Action Party (PAP) was also seen in Queenstown SMC, which the PAR had contested.

==== Withdrawal of RP ====
On 7 July 2025, Jeyaretnam announced the withdrawal of RP from PAR, with effect from the end of the month. Jeyaretnam would be replaced by Hamim Aliyas as chairman.

== Member parties ==
Logo	Name		Leader(s)
	PV	Peoples Voice	Lim Tean
	DPP	Democratic Progressive Party	Mohamad Hamim Aliyas

== Former member parties ==
Logo	Name		Leader(s)	
Logo	Name		Leader(s)	Left
	PPP	People's Power Party	Goh Meng Seng	24 February 2025
	RP	Reform Party	Kenneth Jeyaretnam	31 July 2025

== Central Executive Committee ==
The PAR's Central Executive Committee comprises the following members:

Title	Name	Party
Secretary-General	Lim Tean	PV
Chairperson	Mohamad Hamim Aliyas	DPP
Women's Wing	Vigneswari Ramachandran	PV
Malay Bureau	Abdul Rahman Bin Ahmad	DPP
Malay Bureau	Abdul Malik Bin Rahmat	DPP
Organizing Secretary	Prabu Ramachandran	PV
Organizing Secretary	Han Hui Hui	PV

== Electoral performance ==
=== Parliament ===
Election	Leader	Votes	%	Seats					NCMPs	Position	Result
Election	Leader	Votes	%	Contested			Total	+/–	NCMPs	Position	Result
Election	Leader	Votes	%	Seats	Won	Lost	Total	+/–	NCMPs	Position	Result
2025	Lim Tean	59,875	2.51%	13	0	13	0 / 97	Steady	0 / 2	▲6th	No seats

==== Seats contested ====
Election	Constituencies contested	Contested vote %	+/–
2025	5-member GRC: Tanjong Pagar; 4-member GRC: Jalan Besar; SMC: Potong Pasir (Note: loss of candidate election deposit(s) in contested seat(s)), Queenstown, Radin Mas, Yio Chu Kang	19.08 (Note: Calculation based on https://www.eld.gov.sg/finalresults2025.html)	N/A

== See also ==
- Elections in Singapore
- List of political parties in Singapore
- Politics of Singapore
