= Singapore United Party =

Singaporean political party

- Malay name: Parti Bersatu Singapura
- Chinese name: 统一党; Tǒngyī Dǎng
- Tamil name: சிங்கப்பூர் ஐக்கியக் கட்சி
- Secretary-General: Andy Zhu
- Chairman: Vincent Ng Kian Guan
- Founder: Andy Zhu
- Founded: 24 December 2020; 5 years ago
- Split from: Reform Party
- Headquarters: 338 Ang Mo Kio Avenue 1, #01-1677, Teck Ghee Court, Singapore 560338
- Colours: Grey
- Parliament: 0 / 104

The Singapore United Party (abbreviation: SUP) is a political party in Singapore founded on 24 December 2020.

== Party founding ==
The party was formed out of former members of the Reform Party in the aftermath of the 2020 Singaporean general election. Its secretary-general is Andy Zhu, the former chairman of the Reform Party.

Following the 2020 general election, the Reform Party announced that its chairman Andy Zhu and treasurer Noraini Yunus had stepped down from the central executive committee. Reform Party secretary-general Kenneth Jeyaretnam alleged that Zhu had modified the party's payment policy without prior approval and the pair had been voted out unanimously. Zhu declined these allegations, claiming that he had been ousted via "undemocratic” means, whilst also contesting Jeyaretnam's assertion that the vote against him had been unanimous.

On 24 December 2020, the Singapore United Party was registered at the Registry of Societies, with Zhu becoming the party's secretary-general. Zhu sought to emphasise that the party was not a breakaway faction of his former party. However, analysts had noted that the party membership at the time of its founding consisted of a large number of former Reform Party members. As the party is still relatively new to the electoral landscape of Singapore, it lacks a distinct manifesto or ideology, though it has pledged to work on "bread-and-butter issues" as well as women's rights.

In 2024, the party would enter an informal political alliance with the NSP, RDU and SPP named The Coalition where they agreed to avoid three cornered contests. During the 2025 general election, the party contested in the Ang Mo Kio Group Representation Constituency. On 3 May 2025, they won only 10.84% of the valid votes against the PAP team led by senior minister Lee Hsien Loong, as well as the PPP (People's Power Party) team led by William Lim.

== Leadership ==
The following members are part of the Singapore United Party's central executive committee.

Officer-holder	Name
Secretary-General	Andy Zhu
Deputy Secretary-General	Darren Soh Guan Soon
Chairman	Vincent Ng Kian Guan
Treasurer	Noraini Yunus
Deputy Treasurer	Yap Chin Paw
Organizing Secretary	Kenneth Zhang
Committee Member	Zhang Guoqiang
Committee Member	Choo Zin Chye

== Electoral performance ==
=== Parliament ===
Election	Leader	Votes	%	Seats					NCMPs	Position	Result
Election	Leader	Votes	%	Contested			Total	+/–	NCMPs	Position	Result
Election	Leader	Votes	%	Seats	Won	Lost	Total	+/–	NCMPs	Position	Result
2025	Andy Zhu	15,811	0.66%	5	0	5	0 / 97	Steady	0 / 2	▲9th	No seats

==== Seats contested ====
Election	Constituencies contested	Contested vote %	+/–
2025	5-member GRC: Ang Mo Kio^{1}	10.8%	—N/a

1. : loss of candidate election deposit(s) in contested seat(s)
