= People's Power Party (Singapore) =

Singaporean political party

People's Power Party: Parti Kuasa Rakyat (Malay); 人民力量党 (Chinese); Rénmín Lìliàng Dǎng; மக்கள் சக்தி கட்ச (Tamil); Makkaḷ Cakti Kaṭci
- Abbreviation: PPP
- Chairman: Vacant
- Secretary-General: William Lim
- Founder: Goh Meng Seng
- Founded: 19 May 2015
- Split from: National Solidarity Party
- Headquarters: 39A Jalan Pemimpin #07-07, Singapore 577183
- Ideology: Anti-LGBTQ rights; Vaccine hesitancy
- Colours: Light purple
- Parliament: 0 / 104

Website
- peoplespowerparty.sg (Archived 5 May 2025 at the Wayback Machine)

The People's Power Party (PPP) is a political party in Singapore. Founded in 2015 by politician Goh Meng Seng, the party first contested the 2015 general election in Chua Chu Kang Group Representation Constituency (GRC) and lost to the governing People's Action Party (PAP). Ahead of the 2020 general election, it discussed forming a coalition with other opposition parties in 2018, and attempted to join the Singapore Democratic Alliance in 2020. During the 2020 general election, the PPP only fielded one candidate, Goh, who lost to PAP candidate Tin Pei Ling in MacPherson Single Member Constituency.

In 2024, the PPP formed the People's Alliance for Reform with the Democratic Progressive Party, Reform Party, and Peoples Voice, but left the coalition following differences in strategies. During the 2025 general election, it contested the GRCs of Ang Mo Kio and Tampines, but missed the 12.5% vote threshold in both constituencies and hence lost S$135,000 in election deposits. (Note: The election deposit for the 2025 general election was set at S$13,500 per candidate. Both Ang Mo Kio and Tampines were five-member GRCs; the PPP respectively garnered 10.21% and 0.43% of the vote.) Goh resigned as secretary-general in July 2026.

The PPP is known for its anti-vaccine stance during the COVID-19 pandemic and anti-LGBTQ rhetoric during the 2025 general election. The party has been characterised as a "mosquito party", a term used to describe frivolous political parties in Singapore that lack meaningful public support.

== History and political development ==
=== 2015: Formation and first election contest ===
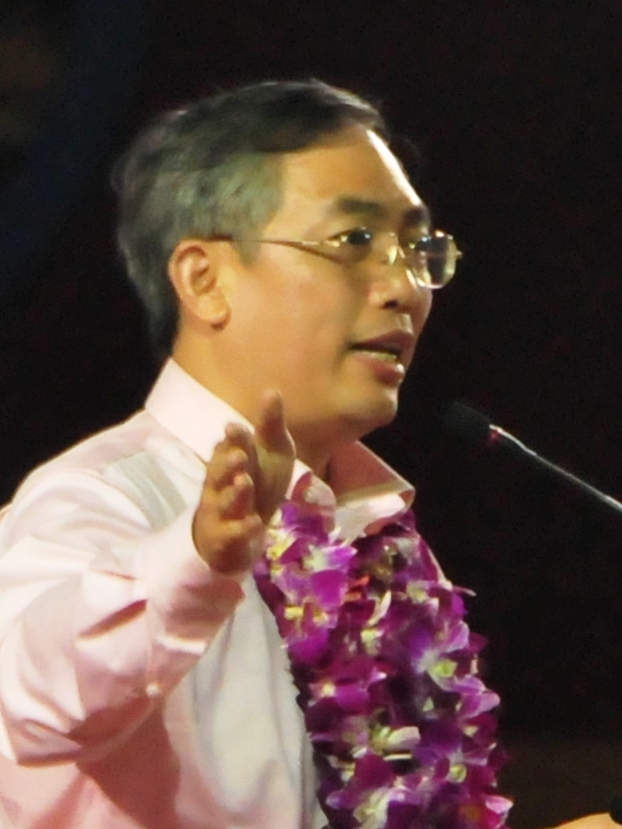
Goh Meng Seng in 2011 as an NSP candidate

The PPP was formed by politician Goh Meng Seng in July 2015, a few months prior to the general election that year. He had contested Aljunied Group Representation Constituency (GRC) in 2006 for the Workers' Party (WP) and Tampines GRC in 2011 for the National Solidarity Party (NSP). In the aftermath of the 2011 general election, he resigned as NSP secretary-general and relinquished his party membership.

The PPP contested Chua Chu Kang GRC with a team consisting of Goh, Lee Tze Shih, Low Wai Choo, and Syafarin Sarif. They were defeated by the team for the governing People's Action Party (PAP) with 23.11% of the vote.

=== 2016–2023: Political alliance and 2020 general election ===
In 2018, PPP discussed the possibility of an opposition coalition, which would be led by former PAP Member of Parliament and presidential candidate Tan Cheng Bock, with the Democratic Progressive Party (DPP), the NSP, the Reform Party (RP), the Singapore Democratic Party (SDP), Singaporeans First (SF), and Peoples Voice (PV). In March 2020, the PPP, SF, RP and DPP instead applied to join the Singapore Democratic Alliance (SDA).

The PPP participated in the 2020 general election, intending to contest the MacPherson and Radin Mas Single Member Constituencies (SMCs). It subsequently exited Radin Mas SMC in favour of the RP and fielded Goh, who said that he was participating in his final election, in MacPherson SMC against PAP incumbent Tin Pei Ling. He was defeated with 28.26% of the vote.

=== 2024–present: 2025 general election ===
In May 2024, the PPP said that COVID-19 vaccination in Singapore should be temporarily suspended "in response to an increasing number of reports indicating significant adverse effects". The Ministry of Health rejected the proposal. By 21 November 2024, the PPP had formed the People's Alliance for Reform (PAR) with three other parties: DPP, RP, and PV. On 23 February 2025, it was announced that the PPP had withdrawn from the coalition, citing strategic differences, though the party said that it would remain open to future collaboration with PAR.

After the release of the new electoral boundaries, Goh reversed his commitment not to contest the election. On 3 March 2025, he announced on a Facebook post that the PPP would be contesting Nee Soon GRC due to believing that PAP might field a "well known LGBTQ activist" in the area. Goh stated that his party opposed the "LGBTQ agenda", considering it a threat to the "sustainability" of Singapore's population growth.

On 4 April, the party published its manifesto, with the slogan "Make Singapore Home Again". Its policies included the abolition of the Goods and Services Tax for essential items, the replacement of the first-past-the-post electoral system with proportional representation, a requirement that foreign citizens reside in Singapore for at least 12 years (with 5 as permanent residents) before obtaining citizenship, and the "protection" of children from pro-LGBTQ materials.

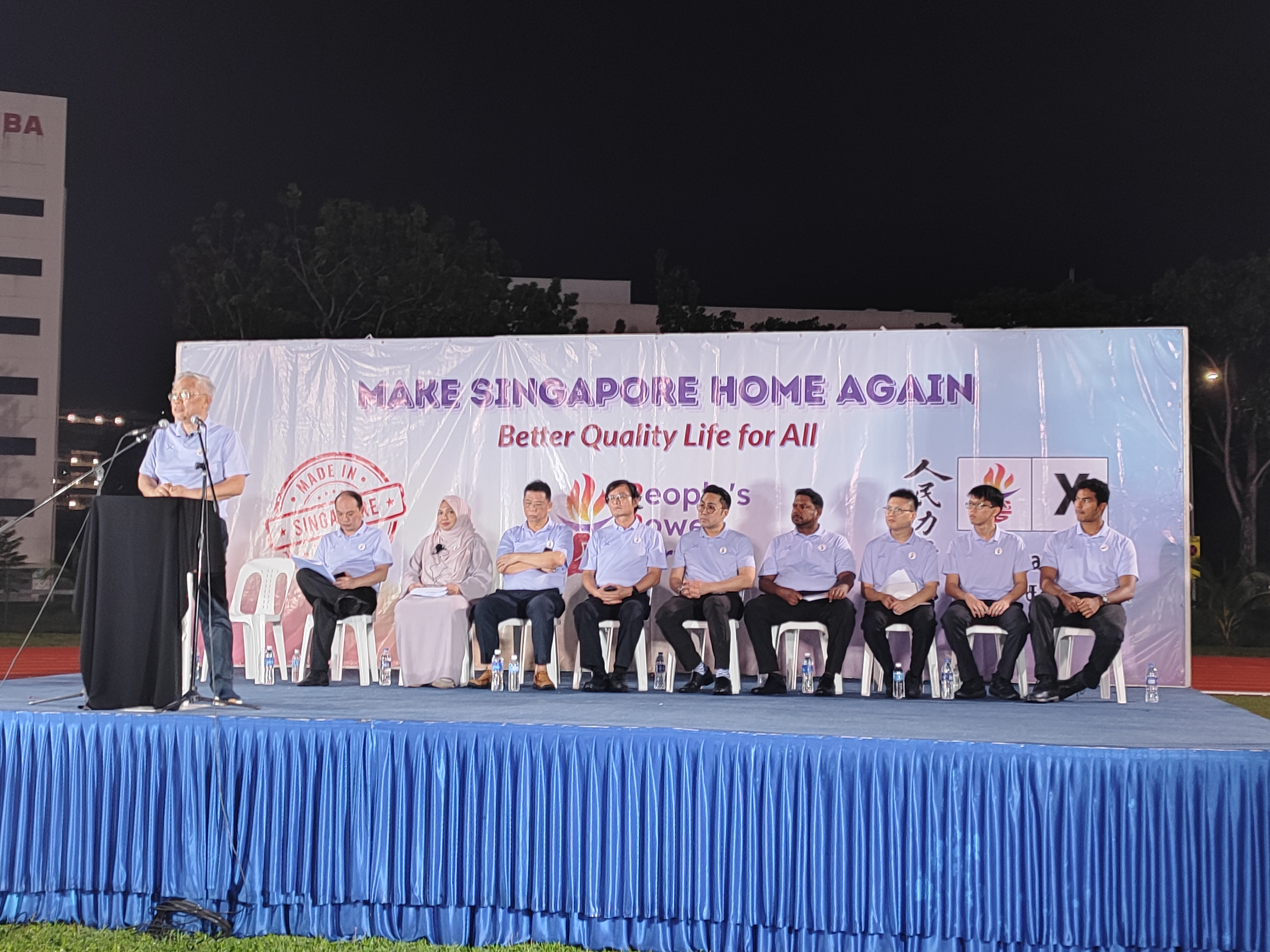
A PPP rally during the 2025 general election

It was also announced that the party would be running in Tampines GRC, Ang Mo Kio GRC, Tampines Changkat SMC, and Jalan Kayu SMC. This appeared to conflict with the plans of other opposition parties, such as Red Dot United (RDU) and PAR. Later on 16 March, Goh said that he would be "glad" to withdraw from Nee Soon GRC, provided the PAP did not field the aforementioned activist. The PPP did so on 22 March, allowing the RDU to compete alone against the PAP. On 22 April, PPP announced they would withdraw from contesting Jalan Kayu and Tampines Changkat SMCs while continuing to contest both Tampines and Ang Mo Kio GRCs.

During the rallies for the election, Goh attacked other opposition parties. Following the WP's decision not to contest Marine Parade–Braddell Heights GRC, he repeatedly accused it and its secretary-general Pritam Singh of "betraying" the electorate. In one rally, he also abruptly stated that he would like to not be asked about Singh again, saying, "I'm not interested in him. I'm not gay." Other speakers at PPP's rallies also alluded to WP being in an "alliance with the PAP", and that electing WP would be "electing PAP in blue".

On election day, both PPP teams forfeited their election deposits for garnering less than 12.5% of valid votes in their respective contested constituencies. The team for Ang Mo Kio GRC received 10.21% of the vote, while the team for Tampines GRC received 0.43%. Having sold his property to finance the PPP's campaign, Goh was reportedly demoralised following the results, and said that he did not plan to return to politics until he had amassed enough money.

On 21 January 2026, the party's website domain was taken over by an unaffiliated foreign entity. On 6 July, the party announced that Goh and Derrick Sim had resigned from their respective positions as its secretary-general and chairman as part of leadership renewal and exited the central executive committee.

== Controversies and ridicule ==
The PPP is labelled by the media as a "mosquito party", a local expression for frivolous political parties in Singapore that attract little genuine backing. Such parties' candidates and members are often treated more as objects of mockery than as serious politicians.

=== Samuel Lee ===
During the campaign period for the 2025 Singaporean general election, it was found that Samuel Lee, a PPP candidate for Ang Mo Kio GRC, had previously been arrested for committing a rash act while driving. The PPP said that he "was remorseful and has taken full responsibility for his actions". Following the election, he left the PPP and became a food delivery rider.

== Leadership ==
=== List of secretaries-general ===
No	Years	Name
1	2015 – 2026	Goh Meng Seng
2	2026 – present	Lim Lian Chin William

=== Current CEC members ===
The PPP announced its 5th Central Executive Committee members on 7 November 2024. As at 6 July 2026, they are as follows:

Title	Name	Notes
Honorary Chairman & Advisor to CEC	Syafarin bin Sariff	-
Secretary-General	Lim Lian Chin William	-
Organising Secretary	James Boo Cheng Hoe@James Care	-
Assistant Organising Secretary	Tan Meng Lock	-
Media	Soh Ying Ping Jonathan	-
Member	Martinn Ho Yuen Liung	-
Member	Ray Chan Swee Cheong	-

== Election results ==
=== Parliament ===
Election	Leader	Votes	%	Seats					NCMPs	Position	Result
Election	Leader	Votes	%	Contested			Total	+/–	NCMPs	Position	Result
Election	Leader	Votes	%	Seats	Won	Lost	Total	+/–	NCMPs	Position	Result
2015	Goh Meng Seng	25,475	1.13%	4	0	4	0 / 89	Steady	0 / 3	▲9th	No seats
2020	Goh Meng Seng	7,489	0.3%	1	0	1	0 / 93	Steady	0 / 2	▼11th	No seats
2025	Goh Meng Seng	15,494	0.65%	10	0	10	0 / 97	Steady	0 / 2	▲10th	No seats

==== Seats contested ====
Election	Constituencies contested	Contested vote %	+/–
2015	4-member GRC: Chua Chu Kang	23.09%	—N/a
2020	SMC: MacPherson	28.26%	▲5.17%
2025	5-member GRC: Ang Mo Kio, Tampines	5.47%	▼22.79%
