= Benjamin Pwee =

Singaporean politician and consultant (born 1968)

Benjamin Pwee Yek Kwan
- 方月光
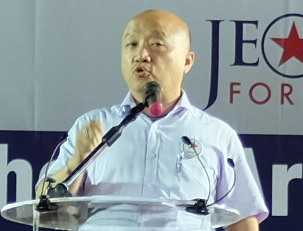
- Pwee in 2015

Personal details
- Born: 1967 or 1968 (age 58–59) Singapore
- Party: Singapore Democratic Party (2019–present)
- Other political affiliations: Singapore People's Party (2011–2013); Democratic Progressive Party (2013–2019)
- Parent: Robert Pwee (father)
- Education: University of Cambridge; National University of Singapore; Nanyang Technological University
- Occupation: politician, business development strategist and consultant

Benjamin Pwee Yek Kwan (Chinese: 方月光; pinyin: Fāng Yuèguāng; born 1968 or 1967) is a Singaporean politician, business development strategist and consultant. Formerly a government scholarship recipient and civil servant, Pwee is a member of the opposition Singapore Democratic Party (SDP).

== Education ==
Pwee studied at Raffles Institution and Raffles Junior College. A recipient of the Singaporean government's Overseas Merit Scholarship, he completed a Bachelor of Arts and Master of Arts in music and literature at the University of Cambridge. He also holds a Master of Business Administration from the University of London and a Master of Public Administration from the Lee Kuan Yew School of Public Policy at the National University of Singapore and a Master of Science in Southeast Asian Studies from the S. Rajaratnam School of International Studies at Nanyang Technological University. He also studied strategic management at the Harvard Business School and completed a Masters in Christian Studies at the China Graduate School of Theology in Hong Kong.

== Civil service career ==
Pwee worked in the civil service between 1990 and 1998 in the Foreign Affairs, Home Affairs and Defence ministries. From 1995 to 1998, he was first secretary for political and economic affairs at the Singaporean embassy in Beijing, where he served as an interpreter and note-taker to former Prime Minister Lee Kuan Yew's many official visits to China. He was involved in high-profile China-Singapore governmental projects including the Singapore Suzhou Industrial Park project, the Port of Singapore Authority (PSA) - Dalian Port Development Project, etc. He was also Senior Assistant Director for Joint Planning and Organizational Development at the Ministry of Home Affairs, handling strategic organizational and technology development for the Police Force, Fire Service, Immigration and Customs Department, etc.

== Business career ==
Pwee left the civil service in 1998 and became the executive director of Medical Services International. Five years later, he left for Hong Kong, where he started E-deo Asia, a consulting firm, and has been its managing director and principal consultant since then. During his time in Hong Kong, he worked part-time for two years in the Central Policy Unit, advising Chief Executive Donald Tsang. He also held Hong Kong permanent residency, having worked there for eight years as a consultant for multinational corporations.

In July 2020, Pwee joined law firm CNP Law LLP as its chief business development officer, and as managing director of CNP Business Advisory.

== Political career ==
=== Singapore People's Party ===
Pwee was a former chairman of the youth wing of the governing People's Action Party (PAP) in the Thomson area. In 2006, he was asked by his friend Wilfred Leung, a member of the opposition Singapore People's Party (SPP), to join the SPP. He initially turned down the offer, but accepted in 2011 after meeting SPP secretary-general Chiam See Tong and his wife Lina Loh.

During the 2011 general election, Pwee joined a five-member SPP team along with Chiam See Tong, Wilfred Leung, Jimmy Lee and Mohamad Hamim Bin Aliyas to contest in Bishan–Toa Payoh GRC against the PAP team. The SPP team lost after garnering 43.07% of the vote against the PAP team's 56.93%. Shortly after the election, on 13 May 2011, Pwee was named second assistant secretary-general of the SPP.

=== Democratic Progressive Party ===
Pwee and five other SPP members left the party in January 2012, citing differences in opinion about party leadership styles and the party's future direction as reasons behind their leaving. In the second half of 2012, Pwee was approached by Seow Khee Leng, former leader of the opposition Democratic Progressive Party (DPP), who asked him to join the DPP. He was co-opted into the DPP as its acting secretary-general on 13 January 2013 and confirmed on 31 March 2013.

On 29 August 2015, ahead of the 2015 general election, the DPP and SPP signed an agreement to field a joint DPP–SPP team to contest in Bishan–Toa Payoh GRC. Under the agreement, Pwee had to resign from the DPP and join the SPP because electoral rules dictate that all candidates in a GRC team have to be from the same party, and Pwee had agreed to contest under the SPP banner. Pwee along with Law Kim Hwee, Bryan Long, Mohamad Abdillah Bin Zamzuri and Mohamad Hamim Bin Aliyas lost to the PAP team after garnering 26.41% of the vote against the PAP team's 73.59%.

=== Singapore Democratic Party ===
In 2019, Pwee left the DPP and joined the Singapore Democratic Party (SDP). During the 2020 general election, he was part of a four-member SDP team along with Bryan Lim, Damanhuri Abas and Khung Wai Yeen contesting in Marsiling–Yew Tee GRC against the PAP team. The SDP team lost after garnering 36.82% of the vote against the PAP team's 63.18%.

== Personal life ==
Pwee's father, Robert Pwee, was a People's Action Party (PAP) grassroots leader. Pwee is married and has three children.

Pwee is a Protestant Christian and has held positions at the Asia Theological Association and Graduates Christian Fellowship (Singapore).

Pwee started the Pwee Foundation in 2012 to sponsor social causes and connect beneficiaries with entities that can assist them, including voluntary welfare organisations, social enterprises and government agencies. He has also done voluntary work with the Singapore Anglican Community Services, Singapore Scout Association, two mental health rehabilitation institutions, a shelter for battered women and children, and a centre for autistic children.
