= Democratic Progressive Party (Singapore) =

Singaporean political party

Democratic Progressive Party: Parti Demokratik Progresif (Malay); ڤرتي ديموکراتيک ڤروݢريسيف; 民主进步党 (Chinese); Mínzhǔ Jìnbù Dǎng; ஜனநாயக முற்போக்குக் கட்ச (Tamil); Jaṉanāyaka Muṟpōkkuk Kaṭci
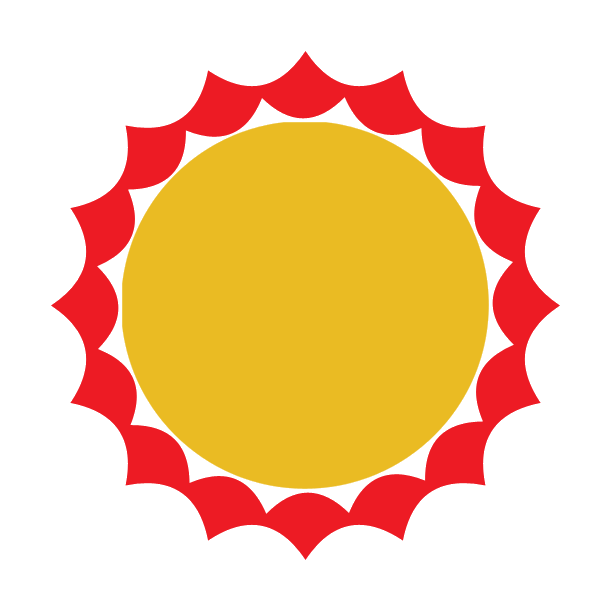
- Abbreviation: DPP
- Chairman: Abdul Malik Rahmat
- Secretary-General: Mohamad Hamim Aliyas
- Founder: Seow Khee Leng
- Founded: 16 March 1973; 53 years ago
- Headquarters: 64 Lucky Gardens, Singapore 467698
- Ideology: Egalitarianism; Singaporean Malay Interests
- National affiliation: People's Alliance for Reform
- Colours: White; Orange
- Parliament: 0 / 104

Website
- https://www.facebook.com/dppsg/

The Democratic Progressive Party (DPP) is a political party in Singapore. It was founded by former Workers' Party (WP) Assistant Secretary-General Seow Khee Leng in 1973.

== History and political development ==
On 16 March 1973, Seow Khee Leng and other members of the WP broke away from the party and founded a new political party United Front (UF). On 5 March 1982, the party was renamed to Singapore United Front (SUF), to avoid confusion with the name of another party, United People's Front.

During the campaigning in the 1984 general election, SUF chief Seow was sued by Prime Minister of Singapore Lee Kuan Yew and other members of People's Action Party for making defamatory remarks at two rally speeches that Lee and his cabinet were guilty of corruption. Seow was ordered to pay Lee and the PAP S$250,000 worth of damages and costs each. On 3 February 1989, Seow was declared bankrupt after being unable to keep up with the payments for the damages owned from two separate but similar libel suits brought by PM Lee and the PAP government.

In January 1988, the party merged with the WP to contest the 1988 general election.

=== 1992–2011: Revival as Democratic Progressive Party and inactivity ===
SUF was temporarily defunct until 1992 until Seow and others resigned from the WP again. They revived the party, renaming it to its current name, the Democratic Progressive Party.

Former WP member Tan Soo Phuan and his son Tan Lead Shake stood as candidates for the party in the 1997 and 2001 general elections. They did not achieve much electoral success, as both saw the candidates losing their electoral deposits for failing to garner the necessary threshold of 12.5% of the valid votes cast (Soo Phuan in the 1997 election in Chua Chu Kang SMC and Lead Shake in the 2001 election in Ayer Rajah SMC).

In July 2002, both father and son were expelled from the DPP for breaching party orders by contesting the 2001 election without informing the party first (Soo Phuan did not inform his decision to contest MacPherson SMC, while Lead Shake contested Ayer Rajah instead of Joo Chiat SMC).

The party became inactive after the expulsion of the Tans.

=== 2012–present: Revival with new leadership ===
After more than a decade of inactivity, Seow invited a group of former members of the Singapore People's Party including Benjamin Pwee and Mohamad Hamim Aliyas to take over the leadership of the DPP in December 2012. Pwee was appointed as the party's Acting Secretary-General in January 2013. At an Ordinary Party Congress meeting held on 31 March 2013, Hamim and Pwee were officially elected as the party's Chairman and Secretary-General respectively.

Pursuant to a Memorandum of Agreement signed in August 2015, Pwee and Hamim resigned from DPP to return to SPP to help their team contest Bishan–Toa Payoh Group Representation Constituency (GRC) in the 2015 general election. However, the SPP team obtained only 26.41% of the valid votes. The duo returned to the DPP soon after.

In 2018, the DPP was present in a meeting with six other opposition parties, the Singaporeans First, Singapore Democratic Party, People's Power Party (PPP), National Solidarity Party and Peoples Voice (PV), along with former PAP MP and Presidential Candidate Tan Cheng Bock, on the possibility of forming a coalition led by Tan for the next election.

On 19 February 2019, Pwee revealed that he had resigned from the DPP and joined the SDP ahead of the forthcoming general election four days later. Hamim took over as the new Secretary-General and leader, while Organising Secretary Ting Tze Jiang became Chairman.

In March 2020, DPP alongside Singaporeans First, People's Power Party and Reform Party (RP) applied to join the SDA.

Although the DPP expressed their intention to contest in the 2020 Singaporean general election, on 27 June 2020, the party announced that they would not be participating and will instead back allied parties RP and PPP.

In 2023, the DPP established the People's Alliance for Reform together with the PV, RP and PPP. Hamim Aliyas was the only DPP candidate who contested the 2025 election under the PAR.

== Objectives and policies ==
A statement dated 22 April 2013 on the DPP website states "The way forward is to build a society that is equal and egalitarian to all citizens."

A statement dated 16 August 2015 on the DPP website sets out the following policies or proposals:

- Employment: Additional policy measures to ensure a “Singaporeans-first” domestic job market, especially in middle-to-upper management in the civil service and government-linked companies, as well as the private sector.
- Foreign workers: Restrictions to foreign workers in Singapore by industrial sectors, allowing sectors like F&B where fewer Singaporeans are trained for or are interested to work, to employ more foreign workers. And for sectors like engineering, healthcare, banking, to have tighter restrictions, to allow Singaporean PMETs to take on these middle-income jobs more easily.
- Re-skilling: better, more hands-on, more commonplace apprenticeship-based re-skilling programmes for middle-aged workers, rather than classroom-based, taught WDA/WSQ-type programmes that do not fit these middle-aged workers’ learning styles.
- SMEs: practical support for SMEs, including setting up an SME assistance centre, a job-matching programme, a revolving loan fund, an incubation programme, and a mentor-coaching programme, to help owners and managers of SMEs to get back on their feet and become self-sustainable in their businesses.
- Entrepreneurs: policy measures to complement the government’s existing range of solutions, to better help local entrepreneurs start a business and earn a living. This includes those in the design, arts, construction, manufacturing and other sectors.
- Central Provident Fund/retirement: a wider range of options and retirement savings programmes that Singaporeans can choose from. Key leaders in the private sector insurance and investment industry to be called upon to come up with better investment and insurance schemes under the CPF structure, to fill in the current gaps in the CPF system.
- Malay-Muslim issues: identifying and challenging more Malay-Muslim PMETs to step forward as next-generation community leaders, and together find new solutions for the Malay-Muslim community.

== Organisation and structure ==
=== Central Executive Committee ===
As of 6 October 2025, the party's CEC consists of:

| Officer-holder | Name |
|---|---|
| Chairperson | Abdul Malik Bin Rahmat |
| Secretary-General | Mohamad Hamim bin Aliyas |
| Organising Secretary | Abdul Rahman Bin Ahmad |

== Electoral performance ==
DPP contested as UF from 1976 to 1980, and SUF in 1984, before assuming its current name. It contested the 2015 general election under SPP in Bishan-Toa Payoh GRC by contributing 2 of the 5 candidates.

=== Parliament ===
| Election | Leader | Votes | % | Seats | | | | | Position | Result |
| Election | Leader | Votes | % | Contested | | | Total | +/– | Position | Result |
| Election | Leader | Votes | % | Seats | Won | Lost | Total | +/– | Position | Result |
|---|---|---|---|---|---|---|---|---|---|---|
| 1976 | Seow Khee Leng | 53,373 | 6.7% | 14 | 0 | 14 | 0 / 69 | Steady | ▲3rd | No seats |
| 1980 | Seow Khee Leng | 28,586 | 4.5% | 8 | 0 | 8 | 0 / 75 | Steady | Steady | No seats |
| 1984 | Seow Khee Leng | 87,237 | 10.0% | 13 | 0 | 13 | 0 / 79 | Steady | Steady | No seats |
| 1997 | Seow Khee Leng | 5,043 | 0.7% | 2 | 0 | 2 | 0 / 83 | Steady | ▼6th | No seats |
| 2001 | Seow Khee Leng | 5,334 | 0.9% | 2 | 0 | 2 | 0 / 84 | Steady | ▲5th | No seats |
| 2015^{1} | Benjamin Pwee | 31,108 | 1.4% | 5 (2) | 0 | 5 (2) | 0 / 89 | Steady | —N/a | No seats |
| 2025 | Hamim Aliyas | 24,956 | 1.0% | 13 (2) | 0 | 13 (2) | 0 / 97 | Steady | | |

==== Seats contested ====
| Election | Constituencies contested | Contested vote % | +/– |
|---|---|---|---|
| 1976 | Brickworks, Bukit Ho Swee, Bukit Merah, Delta, Geylang West, Kallang, Katong, Kolam Ayer, Leng Khee, Marine Parade, Mountbatten, Siglap, Thomson, Upper Serangoon | 25.3% | —N/a |
| 1980 | Aljunied, Boon Lay, Geylang Serai, Kampong Chai Chee, Kebun Bahru, Kolam Ayer, Punggol, Tanjong Pagar | 19.0% | ▼6.3% |
| 1984 | Bedok, Boon Lay, Changi, Eunos, Fengshan, Geylang Serai, Geylang West, Kaki Bukit, Kampong Chai Chee, Marine Parade, Nee Soon, Punggol, Tanah Merah | 34.2% | ▲15.2% |
| 1997 | SMC: Chua Chu Kang^{2}, Kampong Glam | 12.3% | —N/a |
| 2001 | SMC: Ayer Rajah^{2}, MacPherson | 14.2% | ▲2.0% |
| 2015 | 5-member GRC: Bishan-Toa Payoh | 26.4% | —N/a |

=== By-elections ===
| Election | Leader | Constituencies contested | Votes | % | Seats | | | | Result |
| Election | Leader | Constituencies contested | Votes | % | Contested | | Total | +/– | Result |
| Election | Leader | Constituencies contested | Votes | % | Won | Lost | Total | +/– | Result |
|---|---|---|---|---|---|---|---|---|---|
| 1979 | Seow Khee Leng | Anson; Mountbatten | 3,942 | 5.3% | 0 | 2 | 0 / 7 | Steady | Lost |

1. : Collective figures represent SPP (inclusive of DPP) for jointly contested ward, while figures in parentheses/brackets refer to DPP only
2. : Loss of candidate election deposit(s) in contested seat(s)
