= National Solidarity Party (Singapore) =

Singaporean political party

- Malay name: Parti Perpaduan Nasional
- Chinese name: 国民团结党; Guómín Tuánjié Dǎng
- Tamil name: தேசிய ஒருமைப்பாட்டுக் கட்சி Tēciya Orumaippāṭṭuk Kaṭci
- President: Reno Fong
- Secretary-General: Spencer Ng
- Vice President: Ridzuan Mohamed
- Founders: Kum Teng Hock; Soon Kia Seng; Tan Chee Kian; Peter Lim Ah Yong; Ken Sunn; R. Thiagarajah; Litmee bin Rossi; Sim Ah Ling; R. Muthiah; Chan Yeng Cheong
- Founded: 6 March 1987; 39 years ago
- Headquarters: 55 Serangoon North Avenue 4 #04-06; S9; Singapore 555859
- Political position: Centre
- Colours: Orange
- Parliament: 0 / 104

Website
- nsp.sg (archive)

The National Solidarity Party (abbreviation: NSP) is a political party in Singapore. It has participated in all parliamentary elections since the 1988 general election.

== History ==
=== Beginnings ===
The NSP was founded by a group of middle-class businesspeople on 6 March 1987. The founding president and secretary-general of the party were Kum Teng Hock and Soon Kia Seng respectively. Kum was a former member of the ruling People's Action Party (PAP) while Soon was the ex-chairman of the Singapore Democratic Party.

According to its 1995 manifesto, the main political objective of the NSP was to organise and maintain a democratic movement that would ensure the solidarity and establishment of a just political system and standard of living. The party believed in a multi-party political system so that the rights and interests of the people could be proportionately represented. The NSP also aimed to establish an open and freely competitive economic environment that would provide sufficient opportunities for local enterprises. Today, the NSP continues to strive for these values. It continues to promote the establishment of a multi-party political system as well as a pro-business economic environment.

NSP made their political debut in the 1988 general election, and has contested in every election since. NSP also had contested in the 1992 by-election for the constituency of Marine Parade GRC, which was led by Prime Minister Goh Chok Tong.

=== As member of Singapore Democratic Alliance ===
Ahead of the 2001 general election, the NSP became a founding member of the Singapore Democratic Alliance (SDA), along with the Singapore Justice Party (SJP), the Singapore People's Party (SPP) and the Singapore Malay National Organization (PKMS). The Chairman of the alliance was the SPP leader and Member of Parliament (MP) for Potong Pasir, Chiam See Tong (who was the SDA's only candidate-elect until 2011).

On the polling day, the party's secretary General Steve Chia, who contested the Chua Chu Kang Single Member Constituency but defeated with a vote share of 34.6%, was the highest percentage secured by a losing opposition candidate at the election, and Chia assumed his Non-Constituency Member of Parliament (NCMP) post, becoming the first non-Workers' Party (WP) NCMP to do so.

Prior to the 2006 general election, Chia relinquished his position as secretary-general for the NSP and committee member of SDA in 2005 following a nude photography scandal on 24 December 2003 which he was acquitted for. In that ensuing election, Chia did not return to Parliament as another team or candidate outperformed his score (of 39.63%) as one of the best losers in that election (in the case, the WP's team contesting Aljunied Group Representation Constituency who won 43.91%; party's chairman Sylvia Lim accepted the position).

=== Party rebuild and the 2011 general election ===
In 2007, the NSP decided to withdraw from the SDA with a view to "explore new possibilities through wider latitude to manoeuvre, re-engineer, and rebuild the NSP". Sebastian Teo also took over the leadership of the party from Chia. The party acquired a new collective colour of orange for their activity jersey as a sign of vitality, rebirth and unity, and the newsletter underwent a transformation and adopted the new name North Star.

In the 2011 election, the party fielded the most candidates of all Opposition parties for the election, with 24 candidates contesting in four Group Representation Constituencies (Chua Chu Kang GRC, Jurong GRC, Marine Parade GRC and Tampines GRC), and four Single Member Constituencies (Mountbatten SMC, Pioneer SMC, Radin Mas SMC and Whampoa SMC). This election saw a boost in electoral support for the NSP, notably receiving endorsement from the newly formed Reform Party along their supporters. The party was led by Secretary-General Goh Meng Seng (a former WP candidate), and saw introductions to prominent candidates, which include Nicole Seah, Hazel Poa, Tony Tan Lay Thiam and Jeanette Chong-Aruldoss.

However, despite fielding notable candidates such as former MP Cheo Chai Chen and entrepreneur Poa, the party was defeated in all the contested constituencies; Goh resigned from his post shortly after the election.

=== 2015 general election ===
The party expressed intention to contest five constituencies (MacPherson, Marine Parade, Pioneer, Sembawang and Tampines), but the party shortly dropped out on MacPherson and Marine Parade, citing the possibility of multi-cornered contests that were likely to dilute the votes from the incumbent opposition WP and reducing the chance for a more diverse Parliament.

The party later changed their mind a few days later, and announced their intention to contest MacPherson SMC citing closeness with the constituency as they had contested there in the prior election. In a response, a few party members, such as acting secretary-general Poa and a CEC member Fazli Talip, resigned from NSP, citing that they were strongly opposed to the controversial decision to contest MacPherson. The party initially fielded Chia as the candidate, but he later withdrew on 23 August due to the online abuse that received from him, and the party eventually chose Cheo as a candidate. Lim Tean was appointed as acting-secretary general following Poa's resignation.

Prior to the election, a few prominent members, such as Seah and Chong-Aruldoss, left the party. Seah and Chong-Aruldoss later joined WP and SPP, respectively. During the campaigning period, Cheo drew public outcry on an interview citing MacPherson's incumbent Tin Pei Ling's status as a new mother was "her weakness" and saying that she might spend more time focusing on her child than on her constituents, and later claimed it as a joke. On 8 September, Tampines GRC candidate Choong Hon Heng's rally on booing PAP had gone viral. The party failed to win any of the constituencies, and Cheo had his S$14,500 electoral deposit forfeited as a consequence of garnering less than 12.5% of the valid votes cast for MacPherson (215 or 0.82%).

Lim resigned from his post and left NSP in May 2017, and formed his new party, Peoples Voice, in October 2018.

=== 2020 general election ===
The party fielded a total of 10 candidates and contested Sembawang and Tampines in the 2020 elections. The party also expressed interest in contesting MacPherson and Pioneer, but both withdrew and respectively backed the People's Power Party and Progress Singapore Party. Ahead of elections, Chia resigned from NSP and joined the Singapore People's Party and became the new secretary-general a year later.

On polling day on 10 July, the party failed to win any GRCs, but improved their vote share for each GRC.

=== The Coalition ===
In October 2023, NSP joined Singapore United Party, Red Dot United and former SDA partner SPP to form a political alliance, The Coalition. The alliance was not officially registered, but partners were to contest the next election under their own party tickets while collaborating their efforts to avoid 3-cornered contests among Coalition partners.

=== 2025 general election ===
In the 2025 election, the party contested in both Sembawang and Tampines GRCs. Both of these were multi-cornered fights, with a three-cornered fight against the SDP and incumbent PAP in Sembawang GRC, and a four-cornered fight against the PAP, WP and PPP in Tampines GRC. The NSP had also declined to contest in their smaller Sembawang West SMC and Tampines Changkat SMC, who later backed the SDP and WP respectively.

Ultimately, the NSP won neither of the constituencies and suffered its heaviest defeats since the party's inception, as both its teams lost their $67,500 deposits. Their Sembawang and Tampines teams garnered 2.32% and 0.18% of the valid votes cast respectively, the latter also setting the record-worst performance in the Singaporean election history. Following the party's dismal performance in GE2025, NSP Secretary-General Spencer Ng declared that the NSP was "not going to abide by … gentlemen's rules anymore", and decried the idea of "opposition unity" as a mere "illusion." This was presumably a reference to how the NSP had earlier yielded to the SDP and WP in two SMCs. Moreover, according to Ng, the results also showed that Singaporean voters had rejected more "centralised and moderate" parties such as the NSP in favour of other more "radical" opposition parties.

== Political positions ==
NSP has described itself as a centrist party that believes in "fair competition, low unemployment and wealth redistribution." For the 2025 general election, NSP published their manifesto titled "Your Future, Our Priority".

=== Economic policy ===
NSP is opposed to trickle-down economics, instead proposing a minimum wage and green transition fund.

=== Government transparency ===
In its 2025 manifesto, NSP stated that they would hold institutions accountable and conduct independent reviews of government policies. The party also opposes top-down governance and commits to be Singapore’s independent conscience in Parliament.

=== Youth ===
NSP supports mandatory youth representation in national advisory councils, and proposes for the formation of a platform named Youth Assembly SG. In this proposed platform, young Singaporeans can table and vote on policy ideas with a parliamentary response.

== Leadership ==
The NSP is led by the president while the secretary-general is the second-in-command.

=== List of secretaries-general ===
No	Name	Years
1	Soon Kia Seng	1987
2	Ken Sunn	1988
3	Rasiah Thiagarajah	1988–1989
4	Ken Sunn	1989–1993
5	Yip Yew Weng	1993–2001
6	Steve Chia	2001–2005
7	Law Sin Ling	2006–2008
8	Ken Sunn	2008–2009
9	Goh Meng Seng	2010–2011
10	Hazel Poa	2011–2013
11	Jeannette Chong-Aruldoss	2013–2015
12	Tan Lam Siong	2015
13	Hazel Poa	2015
14	Lim Tean	2015–2017
15	Spencer Ng	2017–present

=== 20th Central Executive Council ===
Title	Name
President	Ridzwan Mohammad
Secretary-General	Spencer Ng
Assistant Secretary-General	Eugene Yeo
Treasurer	Zee Phay
Assistant Treasurer	Raymond Chua
Organising Secretary	Sean M.
Member	Reno Fong
Member	Yip Yew Weng
Member	Ong Hock Siong
Member	Ivan Yeo
Member	Lee Wei

== Electoral performance ==
=== Parliament ===
Due to a merger with the Singapore Democratic Alliance (SDA) in the 2001 and 2006 elections, collective figures represent the SDA total inclusive of the NSP, while figures in parentheses/brackets refer to the NSP only.

Election	Leader	Votes	%	Seats					NCMPs	Position	Result
Election	Leader	Votes	%	Contested			Total	+/–	NCMPs	Position	Result
Election	Leader	Votes	%	Seats	Won	Lost	Total	+/–	NCMPs	Position	Result
1988	Kum Teng Hock	50,432	3.8%	8	0	8	0 / 81	Steady	0 / 2	▲4th	No seats
1991	Rasiah Thiagarajah	57,306	7.3%	8	0	8	0 / 81	Steady	—N/a	Steady	No seats
1997	Tan Chee Kien	48,322	6.7%	7	0	7	0 / 83	Steady	0 / 1	Steady	No seats
2001	Chiam See Tong (Note: NSP contested as part of SDA with Chiam as leader of SDA.)	75,248	12.0%	13 (9)	1 (0)	12 (9)	1 / 84	▲1	1 / 1	▲2nd	Opposition
2006	Chiam See Tong	145,628	13.0%	20 (11)	1 (0)	19 (11)	1 / 84	Steady	0 / 1	▼3rd	Opposition
2011	Goh Meng Seng	244,682	12.04%	24	0	24	0 / 87	▼1	0 / 3	Steady	No seats
2015	Lim Tean	79,826	3.53%	12	0	12	0 / 89	Steady	0 / 3	▼4th	No seats
2020	Spencer Ng	93,653	3.75%	10	0	10	0 / 93	Steady	0 / 2	▼5th	No seats
2025	Spencer Ng	3,121	0.13%	10	0	10	0 / 97	Steady	0 / 2	▼12th	No seats

==== Seats contested ====
Constituencies won are in bold

Election	Constituencies contested	Contested vote %	+/–
1988	3-member GRC: Tampines; SMC: Ang Mo Kio, Kebun Bahru, MacPherson, Whampoa, Yio Chu Kang	34.6%	—N/a
1991	4-member GRC: Cheng San, Tampines	37.9%	▲3.3%
1997	5-member GRC: Hong Kah; SMC: Boon Lay, Chua Chu Kang	30.1%	▼7.8%
2001	5-member GRC: Jalan Besar, Tampines; SMC: Bukit Timah, Chua Chu Kang, **Potong Pasir**	27.6%	—N/a
2006	6-member GRC: Pasir Ris-Punggol; 5-member GRC: Jalan Besar, Tampines; SMC: Chua Chu Kang, MacPherson, **Potong Pasir**, Yio Chu Kang	32.5%	▲4.9%
2011	5-member GRC: Chua Chu Kang, Jurong, Marine Parade, Tampines; SMC: Mountbatten, Pioneer, Radin Mas, Whampoa	39.3%	—N/a
2015	5-member GRC: Sembawang, Tampines; SMC: MacPherson, (Note: Loss of candidate election deposit(s) in contested seat(s)) Pioneer	25.3%	▼14.0%
2020	5-member GRC: Sembawang, Tampines	33.2%	▲7.9%
2025	5-member GRC: Sembawang, Tampines	1.2% (Note: Calculation based on https://www.eld.gov.sg/finalresults2025.html)	▼32.0%

=== By-election ===
Election	Leader	Constituency contested	Votes	%	Seats				Result
Election	Leader	Constituency contested	Votes	%	Contested		Total	+/–	Result
Election	Leader	Constituency contested	Votes	%	Won	Lost	Total	+/–	Result
1992	Ken Sunn	Marine Parade GRC	950	1.4%	0	4	0 / 4	Steady	Lost

== See also ==
- List of political parties in Singapore
