= Election deposit =

Type of sum of money in electoral systems

In an electoral system, a deposit is the sum of money that a candidate for an elected office, such as a seat in a legislature, is required to pay to an electoral authority before they are permitted to stand for election.

Typically, the deposit collected is returned to the candidate after the poll if the candidate obtains a specified proportion of the votes cast. The purpose of the deposit is to reduce the prevalence of unserious candidates or parties with no realistic chance of winning a seat. If the candidate does not achieve the refund threshold, the deposit is forfeited.

== Australia ==
In Australian federal elections, a candidate for either the Australian House of Representatives or the Australian Senate is required to pay a deposit of $2,000. The deposit is refunded if the candidate or group gains at least 4% of first preference votes in the relevant electoral division, or the candidate is elected, even if elected from less than 4% of first preference votes.

The States and territories of Australia will have their own individual deposit requirements and repayment thresholds for their separate elections.

== Canada ==
In Canada, there is no longer a deposit requirement for federal elections. On 25 October 2017, the judge presiding over Szuchewycz v. Canada found that the deposit requirement infringed Section 3 of the Canadian Charter of Rights and Freedoms and could not be justified under Section 1 of the Canadian Charter of Rights and Freedoms. The successful Charter challenge of the deposit requirement was undertaken by self-represented Edmontonian Kieran Szuchewycz who had failed to meet the candidacy requirements for the 2015 Canadian federal election when attempting to run against the former prime minister Stephen Harper in the Calgary electoral district of Calgary Heritage.

Before the Szuchewycz v. Canada ruling, a candidate for Member of Parliament needed to place a $1,000 deposit.

== Hong Kong ==
Each list of candidates for the Legislative Council of Hong Kong is subject to a deposit of HK$50,000 for a geographical constituency, and HK$25,000 for a "functional constituency". The deposit is forfeited should the list (or candidate) fail to secure at least 3% of the valid votes cast in the constituency. For District Council elections, the deposit amount is HK$3,000.

== India ==
In the Republic of India, candidates for election to the lower house of the parliament – Lok Sabha – must pay a security deposit of ₹25,000. For state assembly elections the amount is ₹10,000. For Scheduled castes and scheduled tribes candidates the amounts are ₹12,500 and ₹5,000 respectively. Any candidate who fails to secure more than one-sixth (16.7%) of the total valid votes cast in a first-past-the-post voting system would forfeit his or her deposit.

== Ireland ==
In Ireland, candidates for election to Dáil Éireann who have been nominated by political parties registered to contest Dáil elections, as well as non-party candidates who are able to provide detailed information of 30 electors in the constituency who have assented to their nomination, are not required to pay a deposit. Candidates who fail to meet either of these criteria, however, must pay a deposit of €500. This follows a High Court ruling; the court found that the obligatory payment of deposits by all candidates was repugnant to the Constitution of Ireland.

Candidates for Local Elections who have been nominated by registered political parties, as well as non-party candidates who are able to provide detailed information of 15 electors in the constituency who have assented to their nomination, are not required to pay a deposit. Candidates who fail to meet either of these criteria, however, must pay a deposit of €100.

Candidates standing in European Elections must pay a deposit of €1,800.

Candidates who paid the deposit are returned if their final vote total, under the single transferable vote electoral system, exceeds one-quarter of the Droop quota for their constituency; i.e. in a four-seat constituency, the quota is 20% therefore the deposit threshold is 5%. This is also the threshold that candidates' votes must exceed in order for them to claim an election expenses allowance from the State.

== Japan ==
Japan's electoral deposit is expensive. Currently, a candidate for a constituency seat of the lower house or the upper house must place a ¥3 million deposit. It is refunded provided that the lower house candidate gains one-tenth (10%) or more of the total valid votes cast in the constituency, or provided that the upper house candidate gains one-eighth (12.5%) or more of the total valid votes divided by the number of the seats for the constituency.

The deposit for a proportional seat of both houses is as high as ¥6 million and the refund would only depend on the number of seats that the party won. It is refunded in full amount if half or more of its candidates won seats. Local elections including gubernatorial, mayoral and council elections also have the deposit system with the amounts ranging from ¥150,000 to ¥3 million.

The deposit system in Japan, inspired by the Westminster system, was introduced as part of the General Election Law of 1925 to prevent frivolous candidates from running simply for publicity or to disrupt election campaigns. However, it is sometimes attributed that its real purpose is to limit the number of candidates from opposition parties with lower financial power and make sure that those with such a power also hold political power, particularly the ruling Liberal Democratic Party (LDP), which has ruled the country since 1955 except for two brief disruptions. Hiroshi Kamiwaki, a professor specializing in the Constitution at Kobe Gakuin University, has argued that it is against Article 44 of the Constitution of Japan, which prohibits discrimination concerning the eligibility of lawmakers based on property and income.

== South Korea ==
In South Korea, candidates for election to a constituency seat of the National Assembly must pay a deposit of 15 million won, which is reimbursed in full if they obtain at least 15% of the valid votes cast. Half of the amount is reimbursed if they receive over 10% but less than 15% of the votes. Candidates running for proportional seats are also required to pay the same amount, which can be reimbursed if the party represented wins at least one seat.

== Malaysia ==
In Malaysia, the deposit is RM 10,000 to contest a parliamentary seat and RM 5,000 to contest a state assembly seat (increased from RM 5,000 and RM 3,000, respectively, in 2004). Since 2004, it was required that each candidate provide an additional RM 5,000 deposit for cleaning up banners and posters after the election. This increase is seen by some as having led to the government winning a record number of seats without contest in 2004 (17 parliamentary seats were won without contest). The deposit is used to pay for infringements of election laws and is returned after polling day unless the candidate loses and fails to garner more than one-eighth of the votes cast.

== New Zealand ==
In New Zealand Parliament elections, registered parties may submit a party list on payment of a $1,000 deposit. This deposit is refunded if the party reaches 0.5% of the party votes. The deposit for an electorate candidate is $300 which is refunded if the candidate reaches 5%.

== Singapore ==
In Singapore, before the 1976 election, the deposit was set to $500. Per inflation, the amount was revised in 1976 where the election deposit per candidate for the Parliament is based on a fraction (8% as of 2001 election) of the total allowances paid to a Member of Parliament in the preceding year, rounded to the nearest $500. The amount varies by each year and election, as follows:

- In both the recent 2025 and the preceding 2020 general elections, the figure is S$13,500.
- For Group Representation Constituencies (GRCs), the deposit amount is multiplied by the number of MPs in that GRC.
- For Presidential Elections, the deposit amount is tripled. For instance, in 2011, the figure was S$48,000 (triple the S$16,000 deposit allocated for the same year's general election). In the 2017 elections (elected by uncontested walkover), the figure was S$43,500 (compared to S$14,500 at the 2015 general election). The deposit for the recent 2023 election was S$40,500 (triple the S$13,500 at the 2020 general election).

In all cases, any losing candidates garnering less than one-eighth (12.5%) of the valid votes in their constituencies or the Presidential Election will result in the forfeiture of their election deposit.

== Ukraine ==
In Ukraine, during the presidential elections, candidates are required to pay a nomination deposit of ₴2,500,000 (approx. US$90,000) which is refunded only to those candidates that progress to the second round of voting.

== United Kingdom ==
Since 1985 the deposit in elections to the House of Commons has been £500, which must be handed in, in cash, banker's draft, or other forms of legal tender, when the candidate submits nomination papers. It is refunded if the candidate gains more than 5% of the valid votes cast.

Between 1918 and 1985, the deposit was £150 and the threshold for refunding was 12.5%. When adjusted for inflation, £150 in 1918 equates to £7,400 in 2025 and £150 in 1985 equates to £500 in 2025.

Deposits must also be paid by candidates for election to:

- the Scottish Parliament,
- the Senedd,
- the London Assembly,
- the Northern Ireland Assembly.

A deposit of £500 is also required for mayoral elections in those English or Welsh local authorities led by an executive mayor.

A £5,000 deposit must be paid by candidates for election to:

- Police and Crime Commissioner of the police areas of England and Wales,
- Mayor of a combined authority.

A £10,000 deposit must be paid by candidates for election to the Mayoralty of London.

The loss of a deposit by a candidate for a major party is regarded as an embarrassment. The deposit has been criticised for making it difficult for smaller parties to engage in electoral politics and the Electoral Commission has suggested scrapping them for general elections. However, many smaller parties from across the political spectrum participate in elections, including single-issue groups and local independent candidates as well as joke and novelty parties. MPs have also defended deposits as preventing abuse of the electoral system, and being used for free publicity by those who are not seriously contending the seat.

Deposits are not required for council elections.
