= Red Dot United =

Singaporean political party

- Chinese name: 红点同心党; Hóng Diǎn Tóngxīn Dǎng
- Malay name: Titik Merah Bersatu
- Tamil name: ஒன்றுபட்ட சிவப்புப் புள்ளி Oṉṟupaṭṭa Civappup Puḷḷi
- Abbreviation: RDU
- Chairman: David Foo Ming Jin
- Secretary-General: Ravi Philemon
- Founders: Michelle Lee Juen; Ravi Philemon
- Founded: 26 May 2020; 6 years ago
- Split from: Progress Singapore Party
- Headquarters: 10 Ubi Crescent, #07-96, Ubi Techpark, Singapore 408564
- Ideology: Social democracy Progressivism
- Political position: Centre-left
- Colours: Navy Blue
- Slogan: United We Can!
- Parliament: 0 / 104

Website
- reddotunited.sg

Red Dot United (abbreviation: RDU) is a political party in Singapore. It was formed in 2020 by former members of the Progress Singapore Party (PSP), including Ravi Philemon and Michelle Lee Juen. It positions itself as a party with a focus on policies promoting transparency, accountability and citizen engagement.

RDU made its electoral debut in the 2020 general election, contesting the five-member Jurong Group Representation Constituency (GRC) against the governing People’s Action Party (PAP). It received 25.38% of the vote. In the 2025 general election, RDU expanded its participation by fielding candidates in four constituencies: Nee Soon GRC, Jurong East–Bukit Batok GRC, Holland–Bukit Timah GRC and Jurong Central Single Member Constituency (SMC). It did not win any seats; its best result, 26.19% of the vote, was in Nee Soon GRC.

Since its formation, RDU has focused on political outreach and policy advocacy, issuing statements and proposals on issues such as the cost of living, employment and electoral reform.

== History ==
=== 2020 general election ===
RDU was founded on 26 May 2020 by members of the Progress Singapore Party (PSP) who had resigned from the PSP. Although the average processing time for a registration application is two months, RDU received approval on 15 June 2020, three weeks after application, in what appeared to be an expedited process.

RDU had put forward candidates to contest the five-seat Jurong GRC, helmed by Senior Minister Tharman Shanmugaratnam, for the general election, which was called on 23 June 2020 with the dissolution of the 13th Parliament of Singapore. On 10 July, their only team lost to the PAP team in the election with the widest winning margin of 49.22% percentage-points.

=== 2025 general election ===
After the release of the electoral boundaries for the 2025 general election, RDU announced their intention to contest six constituencies: Jurong East–Bukit Batok GRC, Nee Soon GRC, Tanjong Pagar GRC, Jurong Central SMC, Jalan Kayu SMC and Radin Mas SMC. On 15 March 2025, RDU held a porridge distribution event in Jurong East-Bukit Batok GRC, where they introduced potential candidate Pang Heng Chuan.

On 24 May 2025, RDU announced plans to evolve from a check-and-balance role into an alternative government. Following GE2025, where it secured 23.35% of the vote, RDU introduced a "3B strategy" to rebrand and strengthen its leadership. It aims to collaborate with other opposition parties through a proposed digital platform, altgovsg.online, to present policy alternatives. The party is also considering a name change as part of its long-term vision.

== Leadership ==
=== List of secretaries-general ===
| No | Name | Term start | Term end |
|---|---|---|---|
| 1 | Ravi Philemon | 26 May 2020 | Incumbent |

=== List of chairpersons ===
| No | Name | Term start | Term end |
|---|---|---|---|
| 1 | Michelle Lee Juen | 26 May 2020 | 23 Apr 2021 |
| 2 | David Foo | 23 Apr 2021 | Incumbent |

=== Central Executive Council ===
| Title | Name |
|---|---|
| Chairperson | David Foo |
| Secretary-General | Ravi Philemon |
| Treasurer | Harish Mohanadas |
| Committee Members | Ben Puah |
| Committee Members | Eddie Tan |
| Committee Members | Emily Woo |
| Committee Members | Liyana Dhamirah |
| Committee Members | Mohamed Feroz |
| Committee Members | Pang Heng Chuan |
| Committee Members | Sharad Kumar |
| Committee Members | Sharon Lim |
| Committee Members | Syed Alwi Ahmad |

== Electoral performance ==
=== Parliament ===
| Election | Leader | Votes | % | Seats | | | | | NCMPs | Position | Result |
| Election | Leader | Votes | % | Contested | | | Total | +/– | NCMPs | Position | Result |
| Election | Leader | Votes | % | Seats | Won | Lost | Total | +/– | NCMPs | Position | Result |
|---|---|---|---|---|---|---|---|---|---|---|---|
| 2020 | Ravi Philemon | 31,260 | 1.25% | 5 | 0 | 5 | 0 / 93 | Steady | 0 / 2 | ▲10th | No seats |
| 2025 | Ravi Philemon | 94,566 | 3.96% | 15 | 0 | 15 | 0 / 97 | Steady | 0 / 2 | ▲4th | No seats |

==== Seats contested ====
| Election | Constituencies contested | Contested vote % | +/– |
|---|---|---|---|
| 2020 | 5-member GRC: Jurong | 25.4% | —N/a |
| 2025 | 5-member GRC: Jurong East-Bukit Batok, Nee-Soon; 4-member GRC: Holland-Bukit Timah; SMC: Jurong Central | 22.44% | |

== See also ==
- Elections in Singapore
- List of political parties in Singapore
- Politics of Singapore
