= 2025 Singaporean general election =

- 3 May 2025

All 97 directly elected seats in Parliament (and up to 12 NCMPs)
- Registered: 2,758,846 (Note: 131,820 of the 2,758,846 voters were registered in the uncontested Marine Parade–Braddell Heights GRC, leaving 2,627,026 voters able to vote.)
- Turnout: 92.83% (▼2.98pp)
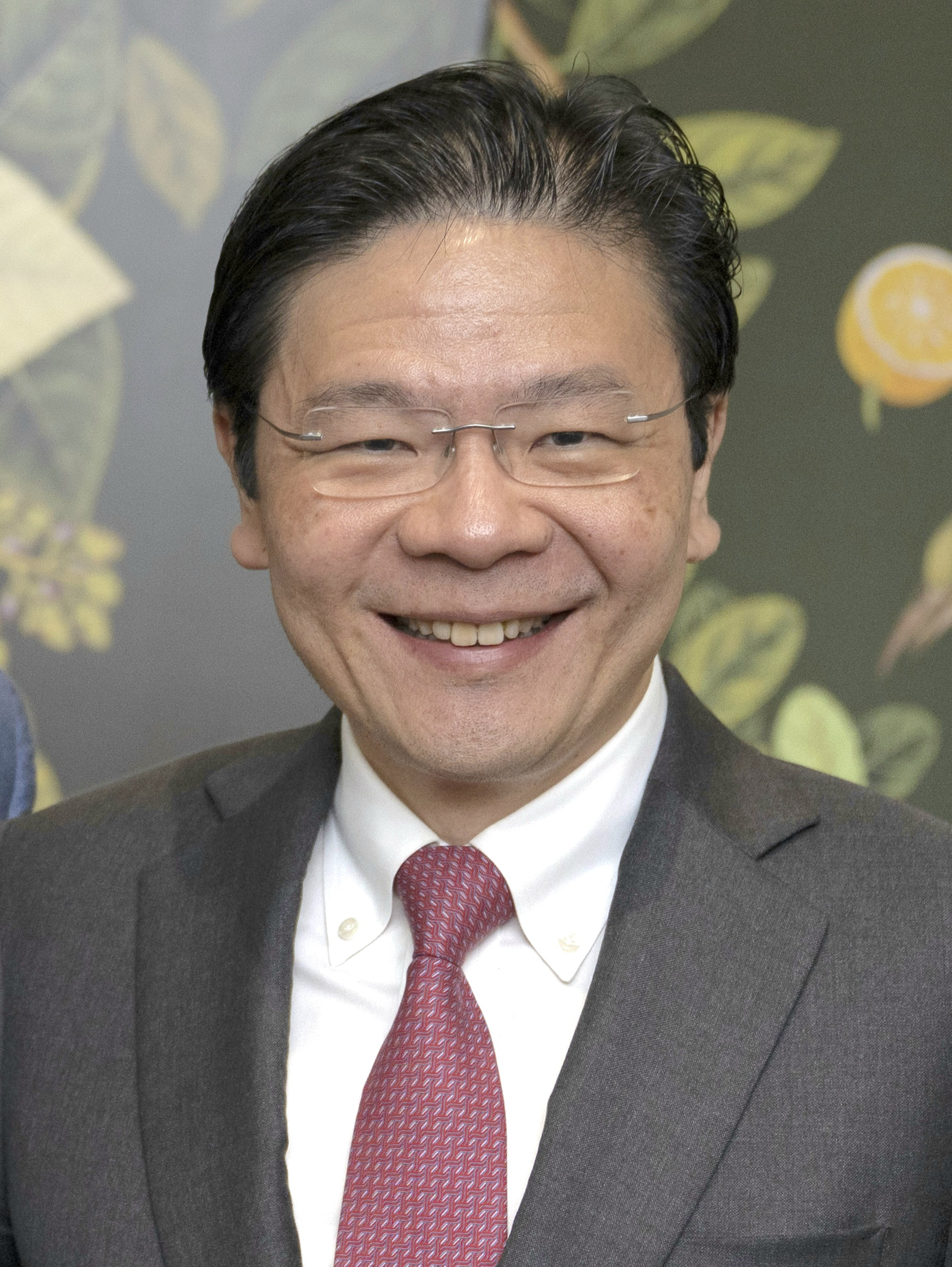

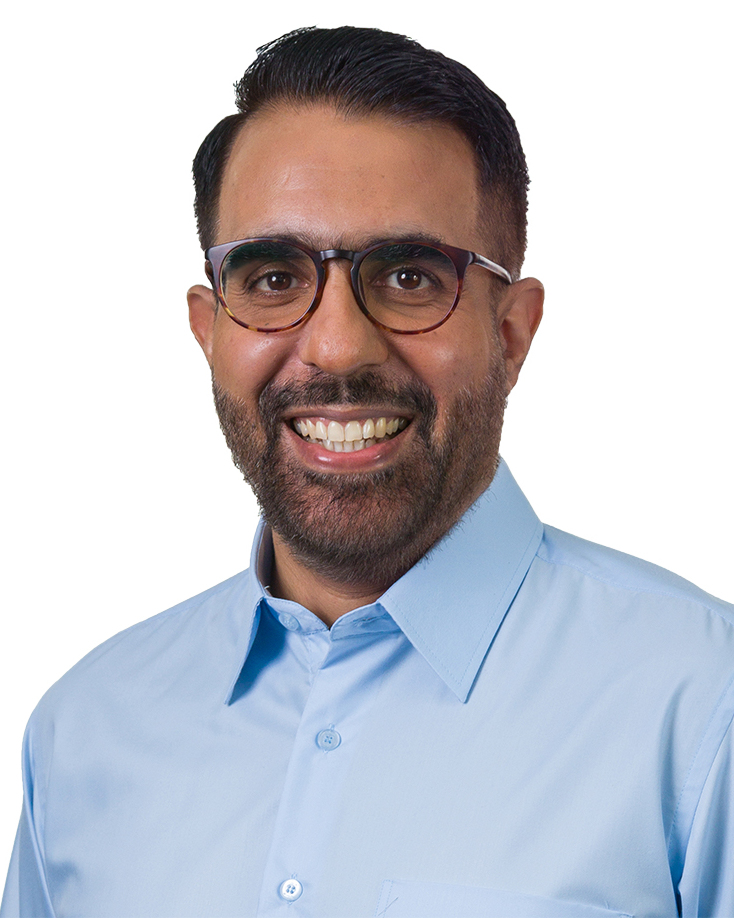
	First party	Second party
Leader	Lawrence Wong	Pritam Singh
Party	PAP	WP
Leader since	4 December 2024	8 April 2018
Leader's seat	Marsiling–Yew Tee GRC	Aljunied GRC
Last election	61.23%, 83 seats	11.22%, 10 seats
Seats won	87	12
Seat change	▲4	▲2
Popular vote	1,570,803	359,161
Percentage	65.57%	14.99%
Swing	▲4.34pp	▲3.77pp
Prime Minister before election
Lawrence Wong
PAP
Prime Minister after election
Lawrence Wong
PAP

General elections were held in Singapore on 3 May 2025 to elect members of Parliament. They were the sixteenth general elections since the introduction of self-government in 1959, the fourteenth since independence in 1965, and the first under Lawrence Wong, who succeeded Lee Hsien Loong as prime minister in May 2024 and as secretary-general of the governing People's Action Party (PAP) that December. The election was described as "a key test of public confidence" in Wong. The 14th Parliament was dissolved on 15 April, with nomination day being 23 April. A record 211 candidates contested the election, including 53 women, the highest number of female candidates in Singapore's history. The number of elected seats was increased to 97, up from the 93 in the previous election.

Political parties focused their campaigns on the cost of living, with the opposition pushing for a reduction in the Goods and Services Tax (GST) or exemptions for necessities. The opposition also called for reforms to public housing policies. Additionally, the Progress Singapore Party (PSP) and the People's Alliance for Reform (PAR), among other parties, advocated for stricter immigration controls. The PAP focused its campaign on constituency-level achievements and emphasised policy discussions, marking a stark contrast to previous elections which had focused more on personal attacks and national-level rhetoric. The elections also saw alleged foreign interference by politicians from the Malaysian Islamic Party (PAS).

The PAP retained its two-thirds supermajority, winning 87 seats and improving its popular vote share from the previous election to 65.57%. The Workers' Party (WP) retained all ten of its seats and gained two additional seats accorded to the "best losers", both of which were previously held by the PSP. As a result, the PSP lost its representation in Parliament and the 15th Parliament comprised only two political parties. Voter turnout was 92.83% – the lowest since 1968. Wong formed his cabinet on 21 May and the 15th Parliament was opened on 5 September.

== Background ==
The 2020 general election saw the PAP lose the most seats in its history at once to the opposition; despite this, it managed to win a supermajority, comprising all but three electoral divisions. It retained West Coast Group Representation Constituency (GRC) against the PSP by 3.36% of the vote, the narrowest margin of victory among all electoral divisions; its largest margin of victory was in neighbouring Jurong GRC. The WP won the new Sengkang GRC while retaining Aljunied GRC and Hougang Single Member Constituency (SMC). Ng Chee Meng, Minister in the Prime Minister's Office (PMO) and secretary-general of the National Trades Union Congress (NTUC), who had led the PAP team for Sengkang GRC, was considered the highest-profile political casualty of the election. The 14th Parliament was the second longest in Singapore's history at four years and eight months, only behind the 8th Parliament; it also had the most sittings in one term at 162, surpassing the 135 in the 13th Parliament.

== Electoral system ==
Under Article 65(4) of the Constitution of Singapore, a parliamentary term lasts a maximum of five years from its first sitting before its automatic dissolution. However, the Prime Minister, with a vote of confidence from a majority of sitting Members of Parliament (MPs), can advise the President for early dissolution at any time. A general election must be held within three months of dissolution.

Electoral divisions, better known as constituencies, are organised into single-member constituencies (SMCs) and group representation constituencies (GRCs). Each SMC returns one MP by first-past-the-post voting, while each GRC returns four or five MPs by party block voting (the general ticket). At least one candidate in every GRC must be from a minority community in Singapore, i.e. Malay or Indian/other (other being not Chinese, Malay or Indian). Whether a GRC requires a Malay or non-Malay minority candidate is determined by the President. A GRC team must entirely comprise either independents or members of the same political party. The voting age in Singapore is 21 years. Elections are conducted by the Elections Department (ELD), a department under the PMO.

The returning officer for this election was Han Kok Juan, the Director-General of the Civil Aviation Authority of Singapore (CAAS).

=== Political parties ===
The table below lists political parties elected or nominated in Parliament after the 2020 general election:

Name	Leader	Ideology	Votes (%)	Seats			Status
Name	Leader	Ideology	Votes (%)	Last election	Non-constituency	At dissolution	Status
People's Action Party (PAP)	Lawrence Wong	Conservatism; Civic nationalism	61.23%	83 / 93	Government	79 / 93	Governing party
Workers' Party (WP)	Pritam Singh	Social democracy Parliamentarism	11.22%	10 / 93	0 / 2	8 / 93	Opposition
Progress Singapore Party (PSP)	Tan Cheng Bock	Progressivism; Social liberalism	10.18%	0 / 93	2 / 2	2 / 93	Opposition (only NCMPs)
Vacant	—N/a					6 / 93	—N/a

==== Pre-election composition ====
Party	Seats
People's Action Party	83
Workers' Party	10
Progress Singapore Party	2
Nominated MPs	9
Total	104
Source: Parliament of Singapore

Under Singapore's constitution, the opposition is guaranteed a set number of parliamentary seats; the remainder beyond the number of elected opposition MPs is filled by the best-performing defeated opposition candidates, collectively known as non-constituency MPs (NCMPs). The 2016 constitution set a 12-seat minimum. The opposition consisted of ten elected seats, all held by the WP, and two NCMP seats held by the PSP.

=== Election date ===
On 8 March 2024, the ELD announced that 50,000 public servants had been appointed as election officials. Following Lee Hsien Loong's announcement in April 2024 that he would step down as prime minister in May, CNA speculated that general elections could be held at the end of that year. However, Wong said in November that the Electoral Boundaries Review Committee (EBRC) had not yet been convened. Following the formation of the EBRC in January 2025, political observers interviewed by The Straits Times (ST) speculated that the election could be held as early as April or May, following the passage of the 2025 budget. July was deemed unlikely as it would be right before National Day celebrations. The South China Morning Post speculated that elections, typically held around the school holidays in March and September, could be held as early as September. On the other hand, Eugene Tan, an associate professor at Singapore Management University (SMU), believed that a September election would be "hasty" for Wong to establish his mandate and that the election was more likely to be held after the announcement of the 2025 budget. A 2025 general election would coincide with the country's SG60 National Day celebrations.

=== Voter rolls ===
The ELD released a statement outlining that the Register of Electors would be refreshed in 2025, being closed for updating a few months ahead of the plausible election date. As such, for the 2025 election, a citizen had to be aged 21 and above as of 1 February 2025 to be able to vote. The latest certification from the Register of Electors was released on 21 July, announcing an electorate of 2,715,187. The voter rolls were opened for public inspection from 15 to 28 February and updated on 24 March, increasing the electorate to 2,758,095; after the writ of election was issued, the number was further increased to 2,758,858. By 18 April 2025, 18,389 voters had been registered as overseas voters, with 8,630 casting their votes at one of 10 overseas polling stations, and 9,759 via postal voting, first introduced in the 2023 presidential election. Despite the increase of the electorate, however, the average electorate per seat saw a decline for the first time since 1959. (Note: If one were to include the Presidential elections, then the 2011 would be the last instance where the average electorate per seat have dropped. This was because of the de-registered voters that did not vote in the May 2011 election and have not reinstated their names to the list at the time of the next election.)

=== Other constitutional changes ===
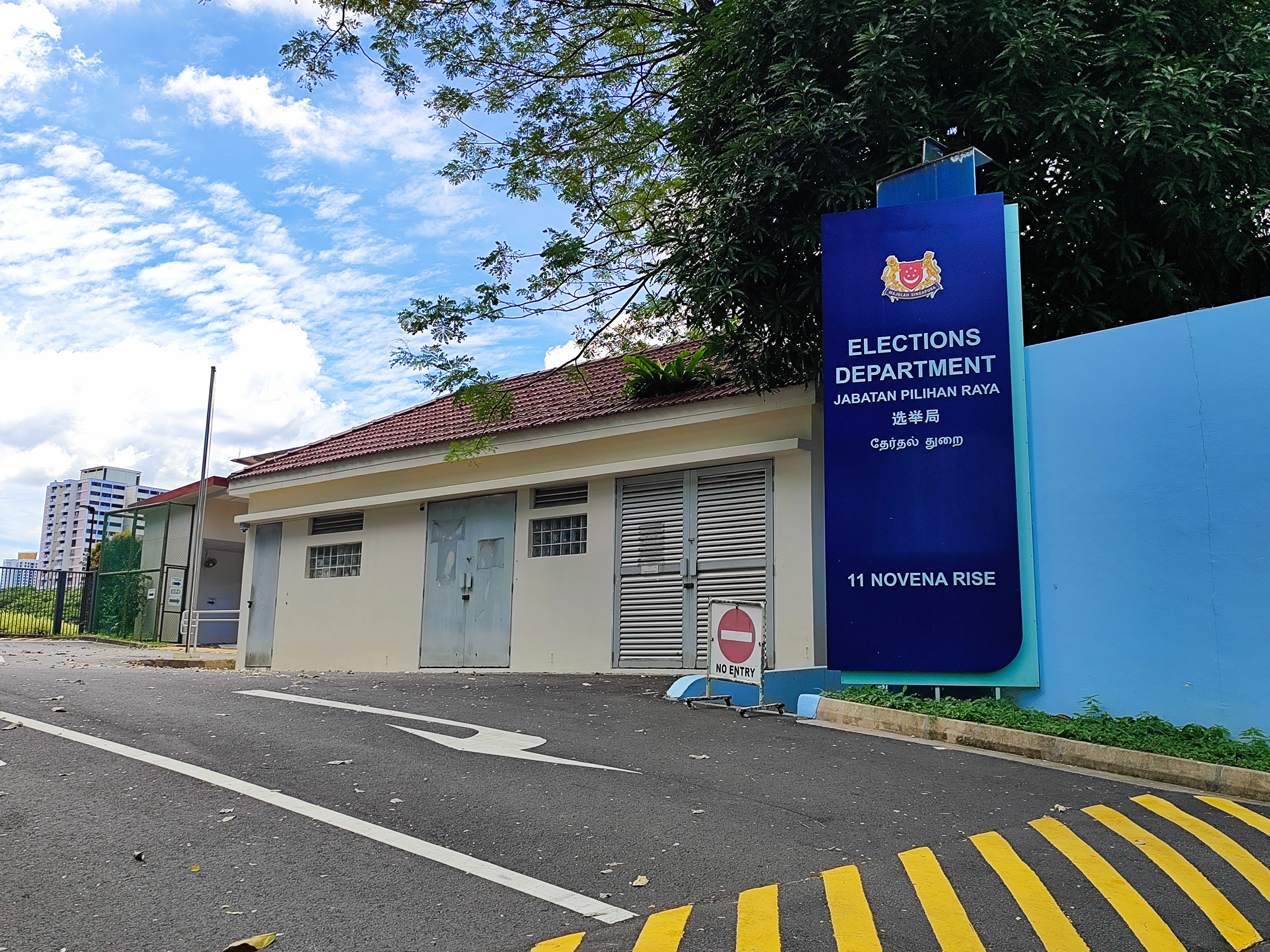
Entrance to ELD grounds

The ELD made amendments together with the Ministry of Home Affairs (MHA) and Ministry of Digital Development and Information (MDDI). It was announced that, if they were foreign or permanent residents (PRs), family members (including minors under the age of 16) of candidates would not need the candidates' written authorisation (or that of their election agents) to participate in election activities, though direct involvement in politics, such as canvassing, would still be prohibited. On 31 May 2024, the ELD announced that the returning officer, appointed by the prime minister, would be authorised to instruct individuals and social media platforms to remove online election advertisements violating election regulations.

The ELD stated on 15 October 2024 that special arrangements at nursing homes, first implemented in the 2023 presidential election, would be discontinued due to logistical constraints and mixed reception. On the same day, Parliament passed a law—which extended to digitally generated or manipulated online content presenting a false account of a candidate's statements or conduct—banning deepfakes of candidates during elections. A spending limit is set for electoral campaigns; on 27 March 2025, it was raised to S$5 per elector per constituency from $4 to account for inflation.

New banners, flags, and posters were prohibited from being posted until the start of campaigning, with exceptions for some used as permanent location markers, or existing ones placed prior to the prohibition (such as town council banners); Aetos Security Management was authorised to take down violating posters at its own discretion.

=== Electoral boundary changes ===
Electoral boundary changes between 2020 and 2025

2020 electoral boundaries

2025 electoral boundaries

	2020	2025
Seats	93	97
Electoral divisions	31	33
Group representation constituencies	17	18
Four-member GRCs	6	8
Five-member GRCs	11	10
Single-member constituencies	14	15
Average GRC size	4.65	4.56
Local voters	2,647,372	2,740,469
All (including overseas) voters	2,653,942	2,758,858
Average electorate per seat	28,510	28,442

The EBRC, which redraws Singapore's electoral map before every general election, was convened on 22 January 2025. It released its report on 11 March, calling for 18 GRCs and 15 SMCs which totalled an increased 97 seats in Parliament. These changes were reportedly to account for uneven growth in the number of electors across existing electoral divisions, especially in the eastern and western ends of Singapore.

Six new SMCs – Jurong Central, Sembawang West, Bukit Gombak, Jalan Kayu, Queenstown, and Tampines Changkat – were introduced. In turn, five existing SMCs – Bukit Batok, Hong Kah North, MacPherson, Punggol West, and Yuhua – were absorbed into neighbouring GRCs. The boundaries of four existing SMCs – Bukit Panjang, Hougang, Marymount, and Pioneer – remained unchanged.

Many GRCs in the east and west of Singapore were reorganised. Jurong GRC was split to become Jurong East–Bukit Batok GRC. West Coast GRC was renamed West Coast–Jurong West GRC, gaining territory in Jurong GRC. In the east, Pasir Ris–Punggol GRC was split into Pasir Ris–Changi and Punggol GRCs. Marine Parade GRC was also renamed Marine Parade–Braddell Heights GRC; it absorbed MacPherson SMC and parts of Potong Pasir and Mountbatten SMCs. The GRCs of Bishan–Toa Payoh, Jalan Besar, Marsiling–Yew Tee, Nee Soon, and Sengkang remained unchanged.

The government accepted the boundary changes. While "heartened that the EBRC ha[d] somewhat disclosed more of the reasoning behind its decisions, contrary to its previous report in 2020", the PSP argued that the EBRC could have considered population shifts without making "drastic" changes to existing electoral boundaries. The Singapore Democratic Party (SDP) expressed "disappointment with the disappearance of Yuhua and Bukit Batok SMCs", which it had intended to contest, and claimed that the process of redrawing boundaries "lacked transparency". Similarly, on 25 March, WP leader Pritam Singh cited the change as "one of the most radical redrawing[s]" in a Facebook post, and said that an opaque institution could become "divisive". The 2025 general election also saw the first walkover in 14 years after no opposition candidates contested Marine Parade–Braddell Heights GRC.

== Pre-election activities ==
=== Vacated seats ===
Six seats were vacated during the 14th Parliament.

Affiliation	Members with voting rights				
Affiliation	Elected	Non-Constituency	As at 2020	At dissolution	Change
PAP	83	–	83	79	▼4
WP	10	–	10	8	▼2
PSP	–	2	2	2	–
Government majority			71	69	▼2
Vacancies			0	6	▲6

==== List of vacated seats ====
The 14th Parliament saw the largest number of vacated seats since Singapore's independence.

Affiliation	Member	Constituency	Date of resignation	Reason	Ref.
WP	Raeesah Khan	Sengkang GRC	30 November 2021	Made unsubstantiated allegations in Parliament on three occasions	
PAP	Tharman Shanmugaratnam	Jurong GRC	7 July 2023	To contest the 2023 presidential election; later elected as the 9th President of Singapore	
PAP	Cheng Li Hui	Tampines GRC	17 July 2023	Involved in extramarital affairs	
PAP	Tan Chuan-Jin	Marine Parade GRC	17 July 2023	Involved in extramarital affairs	
WP	Leon Perera	Aljunied GRC	19 July 2023	Involved in extramarital affairs	
PAP	S. Iswaran	West Coast GRC	18 January 2024	Prosecuted on multiple charges including corruption, later convicted and jailed	

=== People's Action Party ===
==== Leadership succession ====
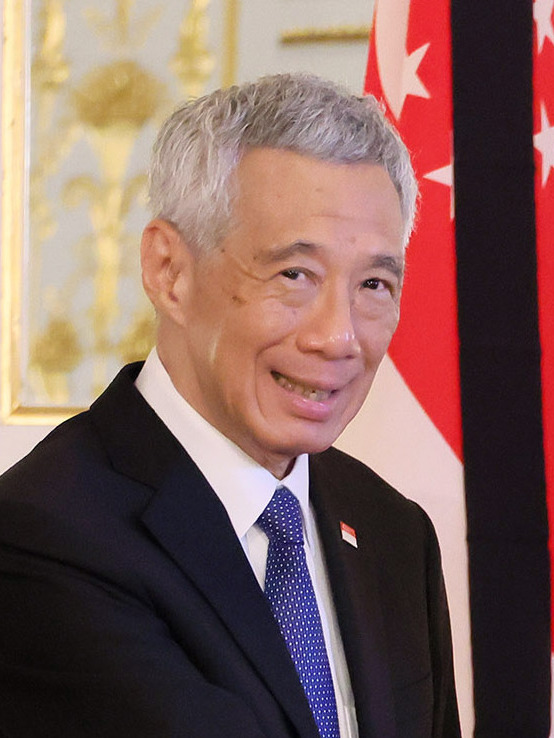
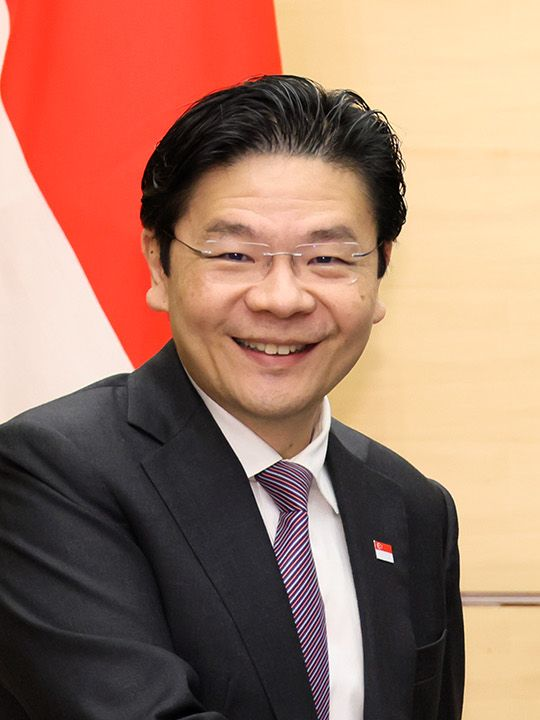
Lawrence Wong (right) succeeded Lee Hsien Loong (left) as prime minister in May 2024, and as secretary-general of the PAP in December that same year.

In November 2018, the PAP appointed Heng Swee Keat as the first assistant secretary-general. ST speculated that with Heng's appointment, he would likely succeed Lee as the next prime minister. He remained in the PAP's Central Executive Committee (CEC) after the 2020 CEC election, which also saw Wong co-opted into the CEC for the first time. However, in April 2021, Heng resigned as leader of the PAP's fourth-generation (4G) team, citing age and health concerns. ST analysts suggested that he could have withdrawn due to the PAP's weaker performance (61.24% of the popular vote) in the previous general election, which possibly signalled a lack of voter confidence in his leadership. However, CNA analysts suggested that Heng's decision could have been "personal", as he had retained support from the 4G team.

In a party caucus on 14 April 2022, Wong, the Minister for Finance, was selected as the 4G leader after consultations with other 4G ministers. On 13 June, he was appointed deputy prime minister (DPM) following a cabinet reshuffle and simultaneously assumed responsibility for the PMO's Strategy Group. On 5 November 2023, Lee said that he would hand over party leadership to Wong by November 2024, before the party's 70th anniversary. On 15 April 2024, Lee announced that Wong would succeed him as prime minister on 15 May. In Wong's new cabinet, Gan Kim Yong was promoted to the deputy premiership and Lee was appointed as senior minister; Wong intended to delay major changes to the cabinet until after the next election. On 24 November, at the PAP's 70th-anniversary biennial conference, Lee resigned as secretary-general while remaining in the CEC. Gan also stepped down from the CEC, while Chee Hong Tat was co-opted for the first time. On 4 December 2024, Wong was elected as secretary-general.

At the party conference for the women's wing on 1 September 2024, Wong pledged to field more women candidates in the upcoming election. Candidates were to be progressively announced before the expiry of the existing parliamentary term, including successors for three of four vacated seats, three new members in opposition constituencies, and at least one candidate in a potential swing constituency. On 7 July 2023, Tharman Shanmugaratnam resigned from the PAP and all governmental positions to run in the 2023 presidential election. He won by a landslide and was elected on 14 September.

==== Legal challenges ====
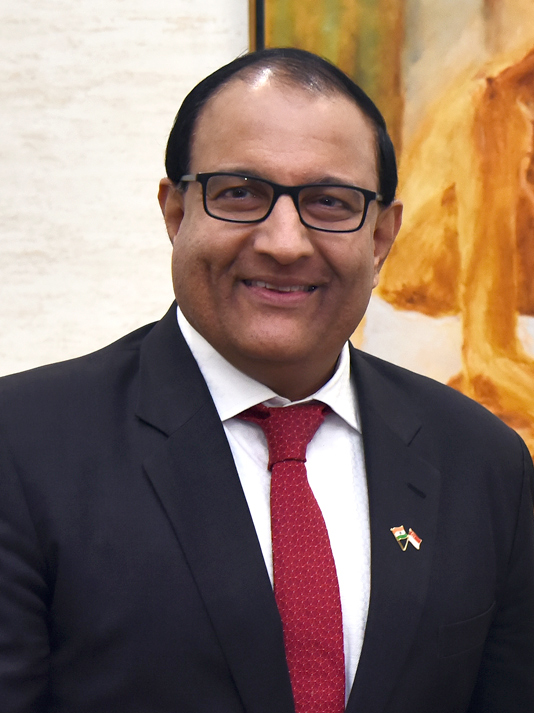
Former Minister of Transport S. Iswaran was arrested in 2023 and subsequently sentenced to jail for corruption in 2024

On 12 July 2023, Lee instructed transport minister S. Iswaran to take a leave of absence and suspended his parliamentary duties after the Corrupt Practices Investigation Bureau (CPIB) summoned him to assist in a corruption investigation. Chee Hong Tat was appointed acting transport minister. On 15 July, it was reported that Iswaran had been arrested for the investigation, which also involved billionaire businessman Ong Beng Seng, and released on bail on 11 July. On 17 July 2023, Speaker of Parliament Tan Chuan-Jin and fellow PAP MP Cheng Li Hui resigned from Parliament and the PAP after an extramarital affair with each other. In a statement, Lee said that their resignations were "necessary" to "maintain the high standards of propriety and personal conduct which the PAP ha[d] upheld all these years". On 2 August 2023, Seah Kian Peng succeeded Tan as speaker.

The CPIB concluded its investigation into Iswaran on 9 January 2024. A week later, Iswaran resigned as transport minister and from the PAP. He also pledged to repay the government the salary he had received since the CPIB investigation began in July 2023. On 18 January, Iswaran was charged in the state courts with 27 offences, including charges of corruption and obstruction of justice. He was succeeded by Chee as transport minister and Grace Fu as minister-in-charge for trade relations. Iswaran pleaded guilty to five charges on 24 September and was sentenced to 12 months' imprisonment on 3 October. He was placed under house arrest on 8 February 2025.

On 17 July 2024, Allianz stated its intention to acquire a majority stake in NTUC's Income Insurance branch for S$2.2 billion, triggering a public outcry over the perceived subversion of Income's social mission. Nearly three months later, on 14 October, the government intervened to block the transaction. After the deal's failure, a bill was passed to amend the Insurance Act. Former NTUC chief and PAP minister Lim Boon Heng stepped down from his chairman of NTUC Enterprise Co-operative on 30 October, nearly six months after the election, in the wake of the controversy.

=== Workers' Party ===
==== Leadership changes ====
After the 2020 general election, the government appointed WP secretary-general Singh as the first official Leader of the Opposition; the party had won ten seats in parliament. In December 2020, he and chairperson Sylvia Lim were re-elected to their posts unopposed, while the four MPs for Sengkang GRC were elected into the CEC. In 2022, former Hougang SMC MP Png Eng Huat retired from the CEC, while Nathaniel Koh, Ang Boon Yaw, and Tan Kong Soon were elected. On 30 June 2024, former secretary-general Low Thia Khiang retained his CEC position alongside Singh and Lim, while Lee Li Lian, former MP for the defunct Punggol East SMC, was reinstated after her exit in 2021. At reinstatement, she was a councillor for Sengkang Town Council.

On 13 January 2019, Singh declared the WP's intention to contest and win one-third of parliamentary seats in the medium term. ST observers speculated that the party could contest an estimated 30 seats in eastern Singapore. Low, who did not contest the previous election due to an injury, was initially adamant to remain involved in politics, though he saw self-nomination as a "back step". On 7 December 2024, he confirmed he would not contest in the 2025 general election. On 18 November, the WP hired external firms to assist with candidate screening and personality reviews, allegedly to "ensure better representation for Singapore in the upcoming election".

==== Legal challenges ====
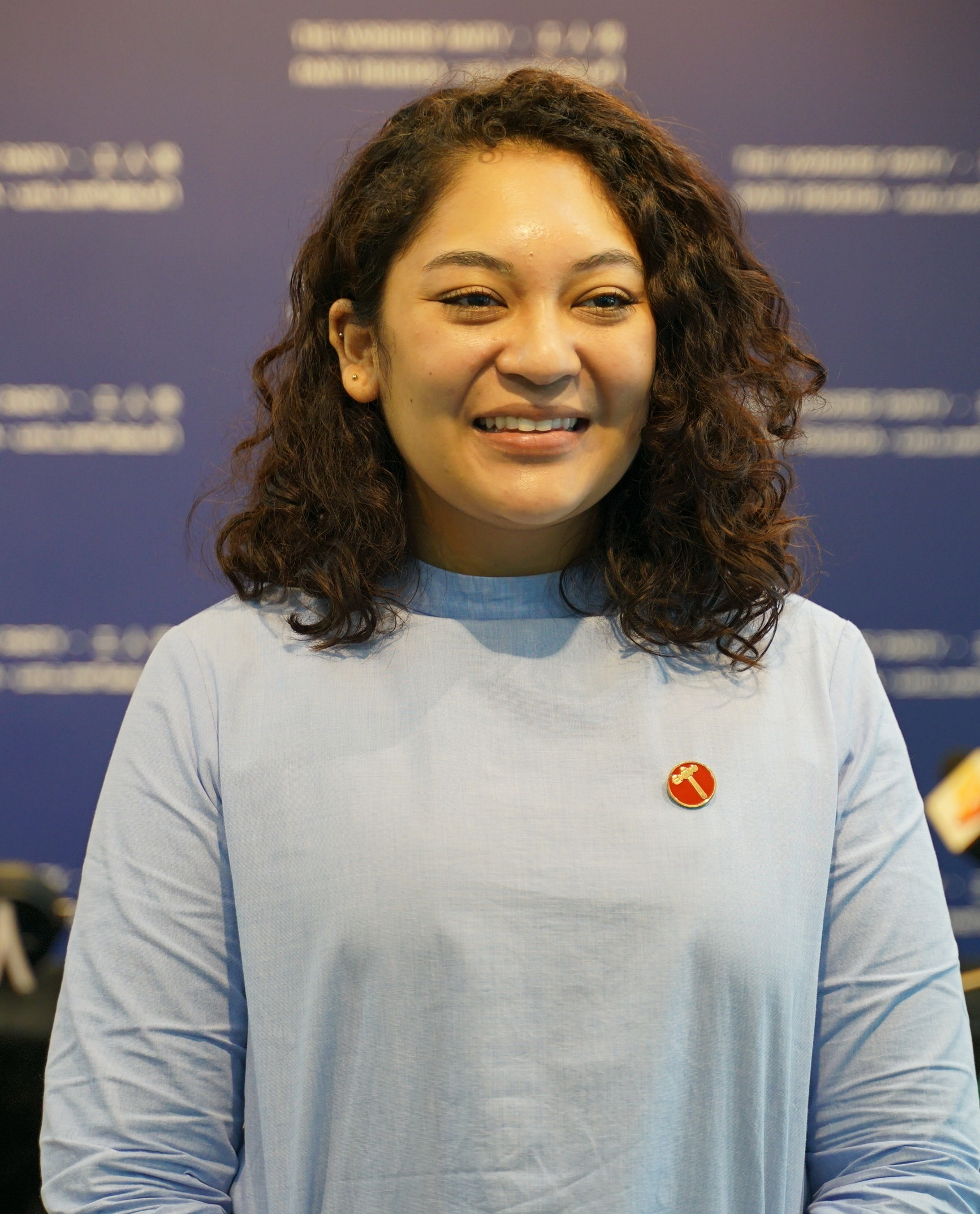
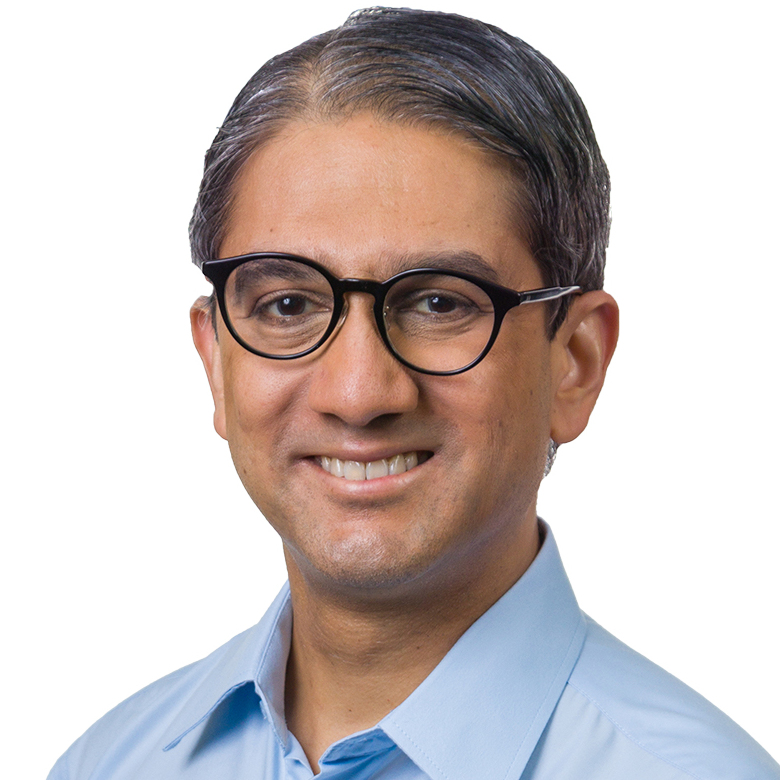
Raeesah Khan (left) resigned on 30 November 2021 after making unsubstantiated allegations in Parliament, while Leon Perera (right) resigned on 19 July 2023 following an extramaritial affair with Nicole Seah.

A trial involving WP leaders over alleged breaches of duties as town councillors for Aljunied–Hougang (AHTC) and Sengkang Town Councils (SKTC) concluded with a successful appeal in July 2024. While the High Court initially found that the WP MPs, councillors, and FMSS owners had breached their duties, the court of appeal overturned these rulings. As a result, the party was awarded legal costs, and the town councils' claims for damages and legal costs were dismissed. In their final review on 27 June 2024, both town councils had improved in their areas of management over the years.

On 30 November 2021, WP MP Raeesah Khan admitted to making unsubstantiated allegations in Parliament on three occasions and subsequently resigned. After the Committee of Privileges' interview regarding her, party leaders Singh and Faisal Manap were referred to the public prosecutor for potentially misleading Parliament. On 20 March 2024, Singh was charged for lying to Parliament by the public prosecutor in a trial which concluded on 8 November. On 17 February 2025, the court issued the maximum S$7,000 fine on both counts; Singh lodged an appeal on the same day, which the High Court dismissed on 4 December. Despite this, he was not barred from elections as the sentences were counted separately. (Note: According to the current Constitution and a statement from the Elections Department, any individual with a fine of at least S$10,000 (US$7,400) or at least a year of imprisonment in at least one separate count of offence carries a five-year election ban and, if they have one, the loss of their seat in Parliament, unless they are pardoned with an amnesty from the President. The last MP to receive this ban was former secretary-general J. B. Jeyaretnam, who fulfilled the criteria by having a fine of S$2,000 or more on a sentence prior to amendments in May 2022. This led to the vacation of his seat for the now-defunct Anson Constituency, which he had held since 1981.) On 19 July 2023, a video of an extramarital affair between members Leon Perera and Nicole Seah circulated online. Both subsequently resigned from the party. While Perera was seen volunteering at PSP events, it was later announced that he had moved to New York City to be an executive director at Yamada Consulting Group USA.

=== Progress Singapore Party ===
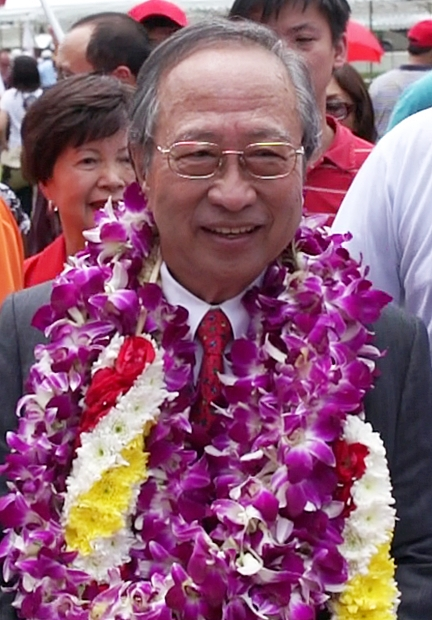
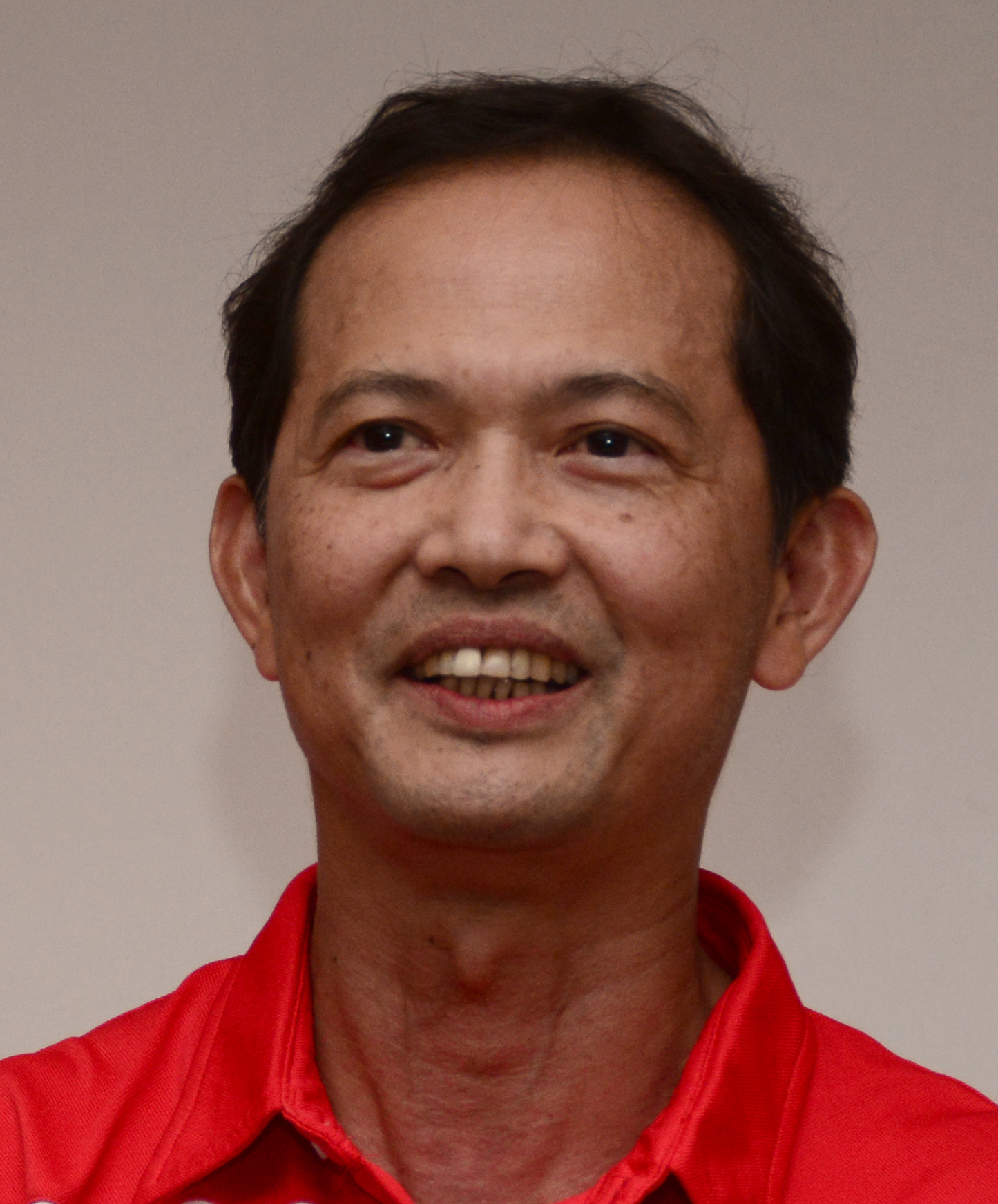
PSP founder/chairperson Tan Cheng Bock (left) and secretary-general Leong Mun Wai (right). Both contested West Coast–Jurong West GRC.

After the 2020 general election, assistant secretary-general Leong Mun Wai and vice-chairperson Hazel Poa resigned from their leadership positions, having been appointed NCMPs by prime minister Lee. Amidst reports of internal party rifts and calls for a refreshed leadership, PSP founder Tan Cheng Bock resigned as secretary-general to become chairperson on 3 April 2021, with Francis Yuen succeeding him. However, Yuen resigned from the role on 26 March 2023. Leong was elected secretary-general on 4 April, which political analysts for CNA interpreted as a sign of the party's confidence in him and an endorsement of his parliamentary debate style. In May 2023, Tan declared his readiness to contest the subsequent general election, while Leong announced the possibility of "proactively facilitating" an opposition alliance.

On 23 February 2024, the PSP announced Leong's resignation as secretary-general. He had accepted responsibility for a recent order under the Protection from Online Falsehoods and Manipulation Act (POFMA) against a social media post by him concerning financial aid. He was succeeded by Poa. On 13 May, assistant secretary-general and psychiatrist Ang Yong Guan was suspended from medical practice. He was found guilty of professional misconduct for improper medication prescriptions contributing to a patient's 2012 death. The party expressed respect for the court's decision. On 5 February 2025, the PSP confirmed that Ang would not contest in the 2025 general election.

During a West Coast GRC walkabout in January 2024, Tan reaffirmed that he intended to contest in the 2025 general election. He anticipated a redrawing of the constituency's electoral boundaries, describing it as "too big". In the subsequent CEC election on 20 March 2025, Tan, Poa, and Leong were re-elected into the CEC alongside six first-time members. The party also confirmed its intention to contest Chua Chu Kang GRC and West Coast–Jurong West GRC, among other constituencies, but did not disclose its lists of candidates. On 26 March, Leong was reinstated as secretary-general. On 20 April, the PSP confirmed that Tan, Poa, and Leong would contest West Coast–Jurong West GRC. Political analyst Felix Tan believed that the leadership change would not sway voters. However, Chong Ja Ian, an associate professor at the National University of Singapore (NUS), raised concerns about the frequency of leadership changes, suggesting that it could undermine the party's perceived stability.

==== Altercations with PAP volunteers ====
On 4 January, PSP and PAP volunteers engaged in altercations during walkabouts in Chua Chu Kang GRC, starting from a Housing and Development Board (HDB) estate in the Bukit Gombak division represented by Low Yen Ling. PSP treasurer Sri Nallakaruppan claimed that PAP volunteers had followed PSP volunteers while the latter were distributing flyers. When asked to conduct their outreach elsewhere, the PAP volunteers allegedly asserted that the area was "their territory". Low countered by accusing the PSP volunteers of starting the altercations, and PAP volunteer Azman Ibrahim released two videos documenting "aggressive behaviour" by the PSP volunteers against him. Tan stated that he found no evidence of such behaviour, only subtitles in the videos alleging it. He later told on the media on 12 January that PSP members had to adhere to the party's code of conduct, and confirmed that volunteers from neither party were physically harmed.

On 30 April, after the PSP urged for the release of police findings on the incident, Poa criticised the lack of transparency surrounding said incidents, terming it "Gombakgate". Police investigations ended on 29 August without action; neither the police nor the Attorney-General's Chambers chose to disclose the investigation findings to the public. The PSP stated that it respected the decision, but called the non-disclosure "questionable". The party also pledged not to repeat the incident, and affirmed its continued support to political opposition.

=== Other opposition parties ===
The Singapore Democratic Party (SDP) began its walkabouts in August 2023, mainly in constituencies it had contested in previously. It had also previously announced its intention to contest Sembawang GRC for the first time since the 2011 general election. On 11 November 2023, the party relocated its headquarters to WGECA Tower, bringing it closer to constituencies where it had been active, including Bukit Batok SMC, Bukit Panjang SMC, Holland–Bukit Timah GRC, Marsiling–Yew Tee GRC, and Yuhua SMC. On 20 February 2025, the SDP announced that secretary-general Chee Soon Juan would contest Bukit Batok SMC for the third time to "keep its primary focus on the constituencies" where the party had maintained a presence. However, following the redistricting of Bukit Batok SMC into the new Jurong East–Bukit Batok GRC, Chee announced on 23 March 2025 that he would instead contest the newly created Sembawang West SMC, while chairperson Paul Tambyah would recontest Bukit Panjang SMC, where he had been defeated in 2020. The Singapore Democratic Alliance (SDA), a coalition comprising the Singapore Justice Party (SJP) and the Singapore Malay National Organisation (PKMS), planned to contest Pasir Ris–Punggol GRC, which it had contested since 2006. SDA chairperson Desmond Lim also stated that the alliance was working to amend its constitution to allow associate members (including independents) to run for Parliament under its banner. Following the redrawing of electoral boundaries, the SDA announced its intention to contest Pasir Ris–Changi GRC and was open to discussions with the WP regarding which party should contest the newly created Punggol GRC. With opposition parties outlining their intentions, Chong viewed it as a strategic move for internal coordination, as none had the resources to contest all seats. Meanwhile, the Singapore University of Social Sciences's (SUSS) Kasthuri Prameswaren emphasised that opposition parties needed to form blocs and adhere to plans instead of "paying lip service".

In August 2020, Kenneth Jeyaretnam, secretary-general of the Reform Party (RP), removed chairperson Andy Zhu and treasurer Noraini Yunus from the CEC following accusations of improper handling of the party's finances, with the CEC unanimously agreeing on their removal. Zhu labelled the allegations "baseless" and accused Jeyaretnam of having an "undemocratic stance". He was succeeded by Charles Yeo. In January 2021, Zhu formed a splinter party, the Singapore United Party (SUP), with several other former RP members. On 15 January 2022, Yeo resigned as chairperson following police investigations against him for alleged criminal breach of trust and forgery. He claimed political motivation, which the police denied, for the investigations. Yasmine Valentina became the acting chairperson. Yeo was also separately charged under the Protection from Harassment Act for harassing a police officer and wounding the religious feelings of Christians. While allowed to leave Singapore for a hearing in Vietnam after posting bail in July 2022, Yeo sought political asylum in the United Kingdom. He was arrested by British authorities on 4 November 2024 following an extradition request by Singapore made in October 2023.

=== Opposition coalitions ===
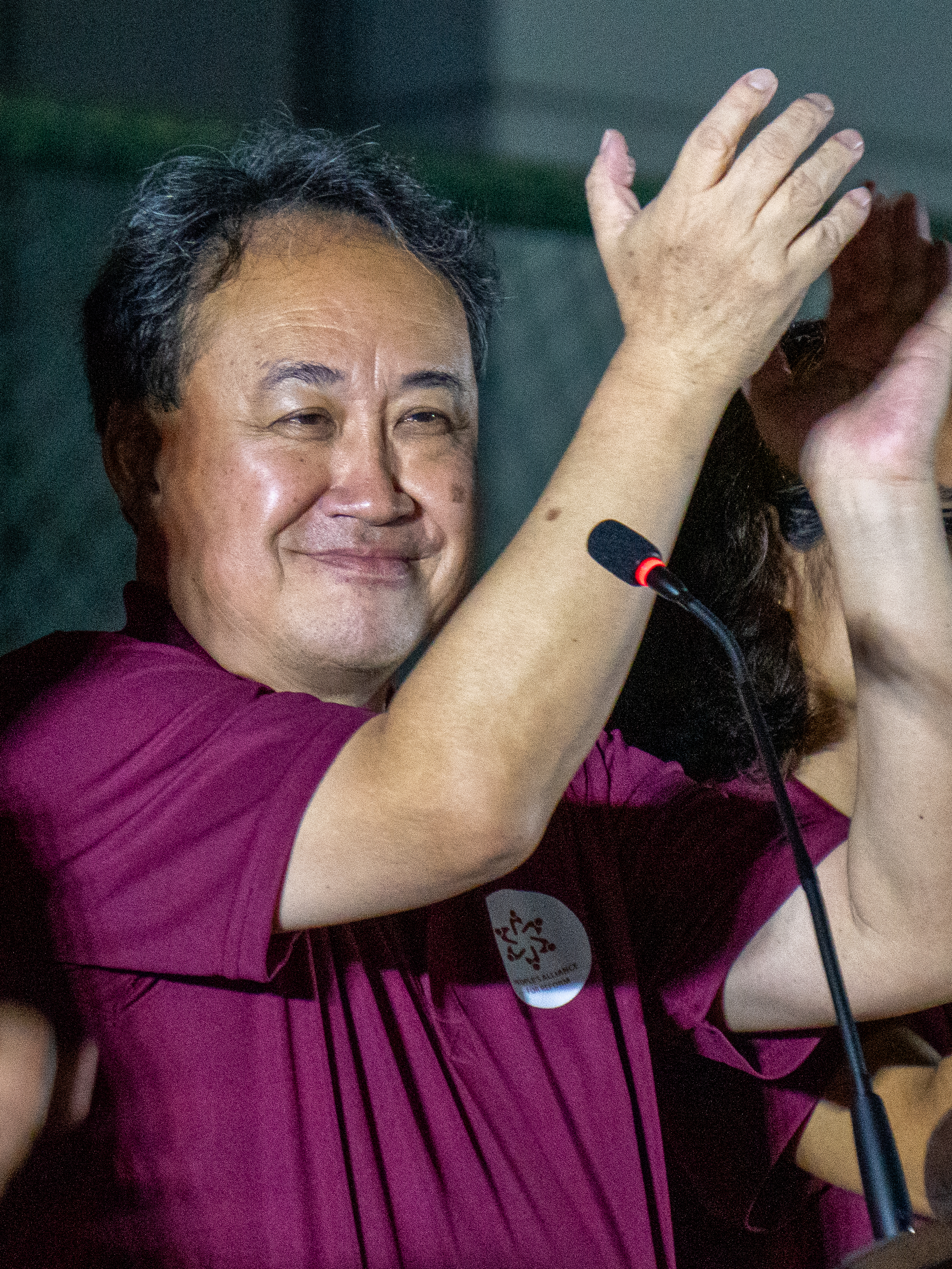
Lim during a PAR rally at NorthLight School.

In June 2023, Peoples Voice (PV) secretary-general Lim Tean founded the People's Alliance for Reform (PAR), the first creation of a political alliance since the creation of the SDA for the 2001 general election. It comprised PV, RP, the People's Power Party (PPP), and the Democratic Progressive Party (DPP), and intended to contest all the seats which the respective parties had contested in the previous election. However, in February 2025, PPP withdrew from the PAR, citing "irreconcilable strategic differences". Lim said that PPP had insisted on contesting in Tampines GRC, a move opposed by the other coalition members. The other parties also objected to its support for halting COVID-19 vaccinations in the country. Despite the departure, Goh Meng Seng, secretary-general of the PPP, stated that the party was open to future collaboration with the PAR. In the same month, the PAR announced its intention to contest in several constituencies, including Jalan Besar GRC, Tanjong Pagar GRC, Nee Soon GRC, Potong Pasir SMC, Mountbatten SMC, Radin Mas SMC, Yio Chu Kang SMC, and Kebun Baru SMC, with combined teams fielded in GRCs. Following the redrawing of electoral boundaries, Lim declared that the PAR was ready to contest in 10 constituencies.

In October 2023, the Singapore People's Party (SPP), National Solidarity Party (NSP), Red Dot United (RDU), and SUP announced a "non-formal partnership" named the Coalition. The partnership was aimed at preventing three-cornered contests, developing a joint manifesto, and exploring candidate-sharing arrangements during elections. While the Coalition had no dominant party or leader, RDU was designated as the secretariat for administrative matters. The Coalition aimed to contest Tampines GRC, Sembawang GRC, Ang Mo Kio GRC, Yio Chu Kang SMC, Kebun Baru SMC, Bishan–Toa Payoh GRC, Potong Pasir SMC, Jurong GRC, and Nee Soon GRC. RDU volunteers also visited Tanjong Pagar GRC, Yuhua SMC, Kebun Baru SMC, and Radin Mas SMC. Following the changes in electoral boundaries, RDU announced its plans to contest the GRCs of Jurong East–Bukit Batok, Nee Soon, and Tanjong Pagar, and the SMCs of Jurong Central, Jalan Kayu, and Radin Mas. NSP announced its plans to contest in the GRCs of Jalan Besar, Marine Parade–Braddell Heights, Marsiling–Yew Tee, Sembawang, and Tampines, and the SMCs of Sembawang West and Tampines Changkat. On 12 April, RDU announced its departure from the Coalition, citing concerns about the involvement of other member parties in multi-cornered contests.

== Timeline ==
=== Key events ===
Date	Event
22 January	Convocation of the EBRC; re-revision of the registers of electors announced
11 March	Publication of the EBRC report
24 March	2025 certification of the registers of electors
15 April	Dissolution of 14th Parliament; writ of election issued
19 April	Deadline of submission of political donation certificates
23 April	Nomination day
23 April – 1 May	Campaigning period
25 April	First political party broadcast
1 May	Second political party broadcast
2 May	Cooling-off day
3 May	Polling day
13 May	Deadline of acceptance of postal voting
15 May	Overseas votes counting
19 May	NCMP nominees revealed
21 May	Assembly of 15th Parliament
5 September	Opening of 15th Parliament

== Nomination ==
Nominations were accepted on 23 April, and nomination centres opened from 11:00 to 12:00 for candidates to file their nomination papers, a political donation certificate, and, in GRCs, at least one minority candidate and a certificate confirming their minority status. The election deposit was S$13,500 per candidate (rounded down from the MP allowance of $13,750; same amount as in the previous general election). As with previous elections, a failure to secure 12.5% of the vote would result in an SMC candidate or GRC team forfeiting their deposit. Ten nomination centres were set up for nominations. A total of 211 candidates contested the election, including 89 first-time candidates, 32 of whom were from the PAP. Twenty incumbent MPs, all from the PAP, did not seek reelection. The election also saw the highest number of female candidates at 53.

== Campaign ==
=== Political issues ===
A January 2025 study by Blackbox Research's sentiment tracker, SensingSG, found that the cost of living remained the primary concern for Singaporeans. Voters also cited employment and housing as key issues, while higher-income groups expressed concerns about civil rights and democracy. Respondents indicated they prioritised the quality of governance at the constituency level rather than the national level, with nearly 90% of respondents expressing this view. Additionally, 88% of respondents emphasised the importance of candidate quality in their constituency, while 87.8% highlighted service delivery and infrastructure as key factors. Unlike in other countries, Blackbox anticipated that the upcoming general election would not be driven by personality-based politics.

Bhavan Jaipragas of ST commented that, besides everyday concerns, opposition parties should address geopolitical matters given their potential to significantly influence domestic issues, particularly with the introduction of tariffs by the second Trump administration. Agence France-Presse and Nikkei Asia expected tariff-based economic uncertainties to be a key concern among voters. On the other hand, SCMP commentators expected voters to prioritise domestic issues over international affairs. Teo Kay Key, on SCMP, added that the electorate could be desiring diverse voices in parliament. Analysts on CNA said that the PAP's traditional "flight to safety" strategy during times of crisis – appealing to a desire to retain familiar leadership – could become less effective amid growing voter scepticism and a more diverse electorate. Analysts also expected that trust-building, demonstrations of sincerity, and clear communication of plans to address both global developments and domestic issues would be essential in shaping electoral outcomes.

Ahead of the upcoming election, CNA and other Mediacorp outlets identified East Coast, Marine Parade, Sengkang, and West Coast GRCs as potential election "hotspots", with residents primarily concerned about the rising cost of living, employment, job security, and housing affordability. In East Coast, where the PAP narrowly defeated the WP in 2020, ageing infrastructure and elderly support were flagged as major issues. Private estate owners also sought greater transparency on lease renewals. In Marine Parade, in addition to concerns regarding immigration, job competition, and school placements, it was speculated that Tan Chuan-Jin's marital affair could influence the constituency's electoral outcome as he was well-regarded among residents there. In WP-held Sengkang, national issues were seen to be prioritised over constituency-level issues like estate cleanliness. Meanwhile, in West Coast, where the PAP won by 3.36% in 2020, estate management and transport were key concerns.

In a CNA survey after the redrawing of electoral boundaries, most residents in redrawn constituencies like East Coast GRC, Marine Parade–Braddell Heights GRC, and West Coast–Jurong West GRC were largely indifferent to the changes. However, residents in East Coast and Marine Parade–Braddell Heights GRCs had questioned the rationale, and political analysts noted that the opposition could face more challenges. ST analysts believed that the boundary changes had strengthened support for the PAP in newly formed western GRCs. Analysts also suggested that East Coast GRC could be highly competitive due to the inclusion of educated, middle-class voters in Joo Chiat, who could prioritise political pluralism and checks on parliamentary power. Political observer Tan noted that younger voters in the newly formed Punggol GRC could potentially influence voting trends, where ST expected a fierce PAP–WP contest. However, Teo believed that many voters would focus more on national issues, party performance, and candidate quality than constituency-specific changes.

=== Rally sites ===
In line with the 2011 and 2015 general elections, each GRC had two sites marked for physical rallies, while each SMC had one. Two sites were also designated for lunchtime rallies. Physical rallies had been suspended in 2020 as part of safety measures against the COVID-19 pandemic.

=== Political broadcasts and debates ===
Two Party Political Broadcasts (PPBs) were held on 25 April and 1 May, during the campaigning period. Political parties fielding at least six candidates under a recognised party symbol were allowed to deliver their campaigning messages on the PPBs. Mediacorp also hosted two roundtable talks on 27 and 29 April.

=== Slogans and manifestos ===
Party/coalition	English slogan	Other official languages (If any)	Refs
People's Action Party	Changed World, Fresh Team, New Resolve – Securing a Brighter Future for You	Chinese: 世界剧变，团队更新，坚持初衷，共创辉煌; Malay: Dunia Berkisar, Barisan Segar, Azam Berkobar; Tamil: மாறிவரும் உலகம், புதிய அணி, மாறாத உறுதி	
Workers' Party	Working for Singapore	Chinese: 投工人党一票，为国效劳; Malay: Bekerja Untuk Singapura; Tamil: சிங்கப்பூருக்கு உழைக்கிறோம்	
Progress Singapore Party	Progress for All	Chinese: 携手前进; Malay: Kemajuan Untuk Semua; Tamil: அனைவருக்கும் முன்னேற்றம்	
People's Power Party	Make Singapore Home Again	Chinese: 新加坡是吾家; Malay: Jadikan Singapura Rumah Semula	
Singapore Democratic Party	Thrive, Not Just Survive	Chinese: 走出平庸，迈向共荣; Malay: Berkembang Maju, Bukan Sekadar Bertahan; Tamil: செழித்து வளருங்கள், வெறுமனே வாழாதீர்கள்	
Singapore People's Party	It Is Time	Chinese: 现在是时候; Malay: Sudah Tiba Masanya; Tamil: இதுவே தகுந்த நேரம்	
Red Dot United	First-Class Citizens, Fairer Singapore	Chinese: 头等公民，更公平的新加坡; Malay: Warga Kelas Pertama, Singapura Yang Lebih Adil; Tamil: முதல்தரமான குடிமக்கள், நியாயமான சிங்கப்பூர்	
National Solidarity Party	Your Future, Our Priority – A Bright Future for Singapore	Chinese: 您的未来，我们的首要使命和任务; Malay: Masa Hadapan Anda, Keutamaan Kami; Tamil: உங்கள் எதிர்காலம், எங்கள் முன்னுரிமை	
Singapore Democratic Alliance	Make Change Happen	Chinese: 为国挺身, 一起奋进; Malay: Perubahan Di Tangan Anda; Tamil: சிங்கப்பூர் உங்களை நம்பி இருக்கிறது. மாற்றத்தைஏற்படுத்துங்கள்.	
Singapore United Party	Moving Forward, Together	Chinese: 共同前进; Malay: Maju Ke Hadapan, Bersama; Tamil: ஒன்றாக முன்னேறுவோம்	
People's Alliance for Reform	Take Back What Belongs to You	Chinese: 拿回属于你的东西; Malay: Ambil Balik Apa Yang Hak Awak; Tamil: உனக்குரியதை எடுத்துக்கொள்	
Darryl Lo	Your Voice, Our Future	Chinese: 您的心声，我们的未来; Malay: Suara Anda, Masa Depan Kita; Tamil: உங்கள் குரல், நமது எதிர்காலம்	
Jeremy Tan	Be Retired, Not Tired		

=== Opinion polls ===
Under Section 78C of the Parliamentary Elections Act, it is illegal to publish the results of any election survey during the campaign period.

Dates conducted	Pollster	Client	Sample size	PAP	WP	PSP	Others	Lead
25 Mar – 1 Apr 2025	YouGov	N/A	1,845	40%	12%	1%	47% SPP on 1% SDP on 1% NSP on 1% Other on 1% Rather not say on 29% Don't know on 13%	28
10 July 2020	2020 general election	–	–	61.23%	11.22%	10.18%	17.37% SPP on 1.52% SDP on 4.45% NSP on 3.75% Other on 7.65%	50.01

=== Foreign interference ===
On 25 April, the Infocomm Media Development Authority (IMDA) ordered Meta to restrict Singaporeans' access to social media posts by foreign nationals it had flagged as foreign interference in the election. Among those accused of illegal campaigning were Zulfikar Shariff, an Australian citizen and former Internal Security Act (ISA) detainee who renounced his Singapore citizenship in 2020, and two Malaysians: Iskandar Abdul Samad, national treasurer of PAS, and Mohamed Sukri Omar, the PAS youth chief in Selangor. Iskandar had expressed support for WP MP Faisal Manap, while Sukri reposted a post by Zulfikar criticising Malay–Muslim MPs for failing to represent Muslim interests. Senior minister of state Zaqy Mohamad warned of disruption if Singaporeans voted along religious lines, while saying that such voting patterns could be common outside of Singapore. However, Iskandar denied the accusations and "slammed" the attempt to link PAS to the WP, further stating that the post was directed towards Malaysian Malay–Muslims rather than Singaporeans.

Noor Deros, a Singaporean Islamic religious teacher based in Kuala Lumpur, claimed that the WP "had agreed to his political demands" after he met with certain Malay WP candidates. Singh denied this, adding that while the WP "[had] no control over foreigners supporting candidates", he stated that the party would be unsuccessful if it "[played the] race and religion card". Other opposition parties, including the SDP, PSP and NSP, also stated their opposition to foreign interference and rejected foreign support. Deros denied interference in Singaporean politics and claimed to have advocated on behalf of "marginalised" Malay–Muslim Singaporeans. Separately, one day after the restriction was imposed, RDU candidate Liyana Dhamirah lodged a police report for online harassment pertaining to "racist and sexist undertones".

As of 29 April, there were around 5,000 comments found posted by 900 fake Facebook accounts and bots promoting anti-PAP and anti-WP sentiment and targeting news coverage of foreign interference; the Ministry of Digital Development and Information (MDDI) urged Singaporeans to remain discerning in their consumption of information. On 30 April, Jom, an online publication website, was blocked by MDDI for promoting unauthorised third-party paid online election advertising (OEA) and the use of forbidden articles and materials.

=== Party campaigns ===
==== People's Action Party ====
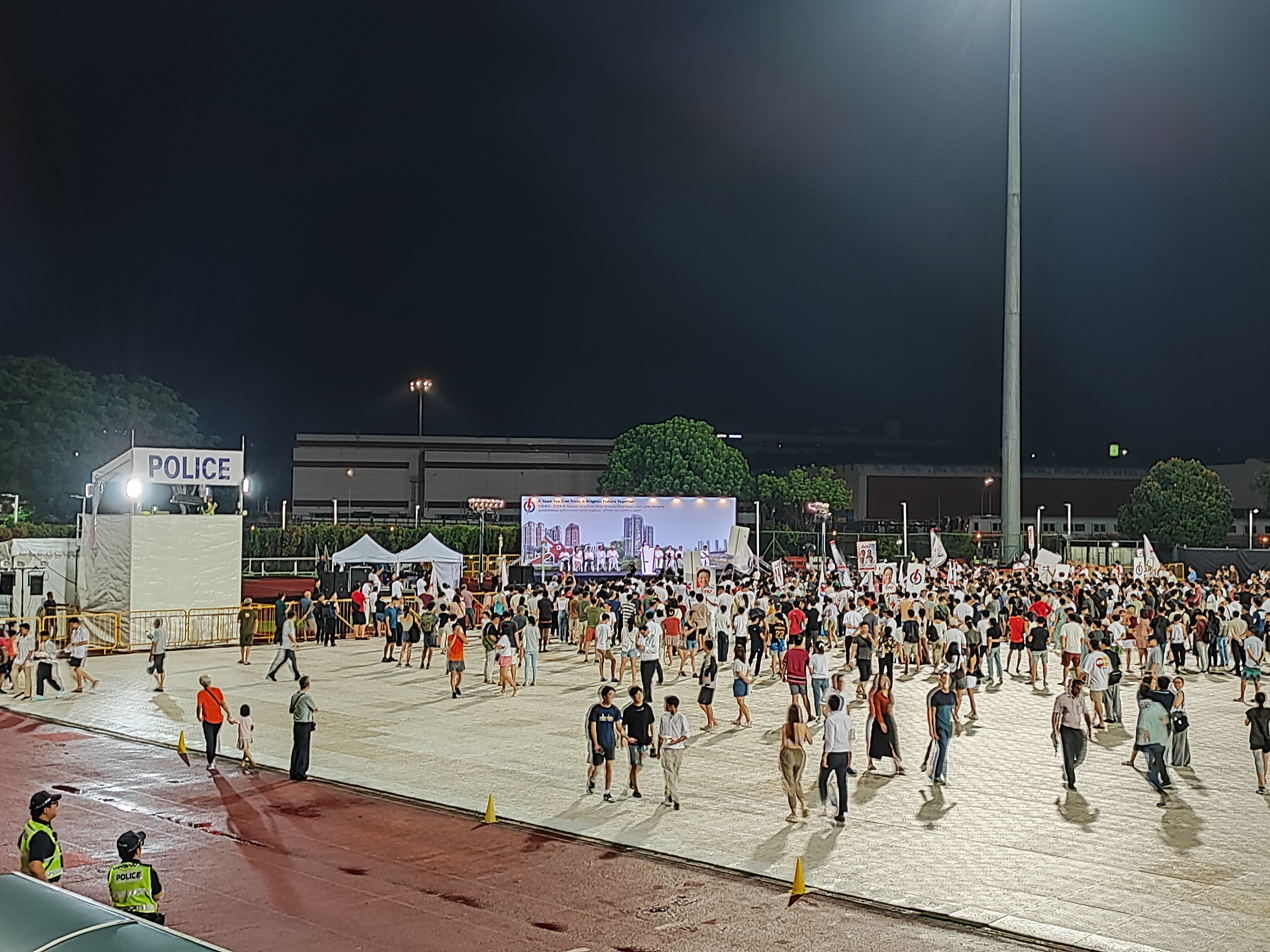
A PAP rally in Bishan–Toa Payoh GRC on 30 April.

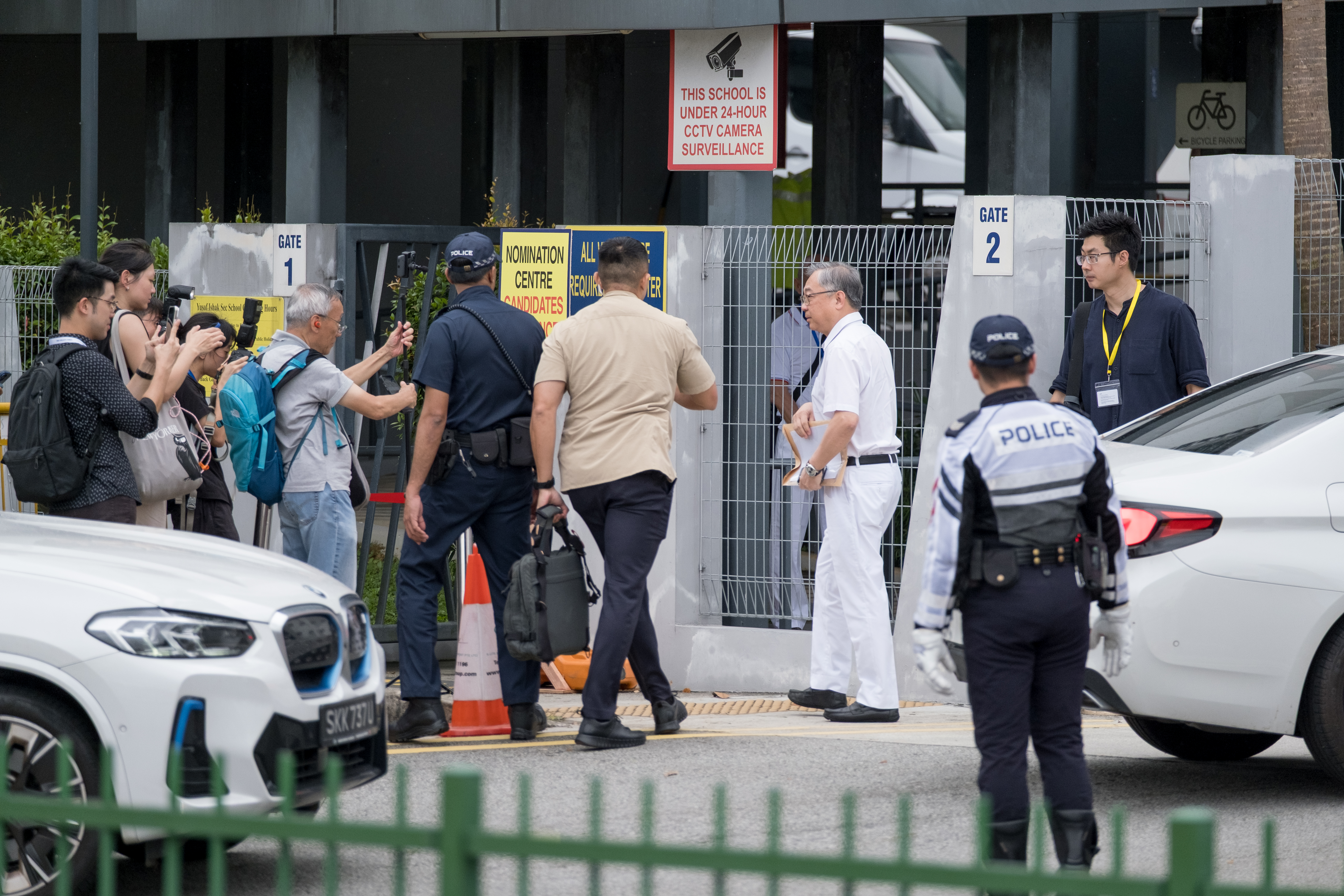
Deputy Prime Minister Gan Kim Yong (in white) at Yusof Ishak Secondary School on Nomination Day. He was part of the PAP team for Punggol GRC.

The 2025 general election was the first under Wong's leadership, with Nikkei Asia describing the vote as "a key test of public confidence" in the new prime minister. On 13 April, Wong acknowledged that the PAP would face a "fiercely contested" election, with no guaranteed "safe seats" for the party. He also announced that the PAP would field at least 30 new candidates in the election – the largest slate in the party's recent history – citing "profound changes" and growing global uncertainty as reasons for calling for the vote. According to him, the election allowed Singaporeans to choose a leadership team to navigate future challenges. Thirty-two new PAP candidates were introduced in the election, including a former Nominated MP (NMP), a former Chief of Army for the Singapore Armed Forces (SAF), six civil servants, a chief of staff at the SAF, and a Mediacorp news presenter. Nineteen PAP MPs retired, including four cabinet ministers (Ng Eng Hen, Maliki Osman, Senior Minister Teo Chee Hean, and Deputy Prime Minister Heng Swee Keat), Senior Ministers of State Amy Khor and Heng Chee How, and five one-term MPs.

On 17 April, the PAP launched its manifesto, presented as a "roadmap" in navigating global uncertainties. To address the cost of living, the party planned to distribute CDC vouchers, cash payouts, and utility rebates to households, while enhancing support schemes for lower-income families and seniors such as ComCare, Silver Support, and ComLink+. It also promised to reduce preschool fees, raise childcare subsidies, expand parental leave, and provide more support for larger families. The PAP aimed to support businesses facing rising costs with tax rebates and policies like the Progressive Wage Credit Scheme. It also proposed investment in transport, digital infrastructure, and clean energy (including nuclear) while accelerating tech adoption. For seniors, it proposed raising the re-employment age, increasing CPF contributions, and co-funding wages. PMETs (professionals, managers, executives and technicians) were to receive help through leadership development, re-skilling initiatives, and jobseeker support under SkillsFuture. On housing, the party made plans to build 50,000 new flats in the next three years and offer more public housing options for higher-income couples and singles. It also planned to rejuvenate new towns through the Voluntary Early Redevelopment Scheme.

Addressing Pritam Singh regarding WP criticisms that labour (NTUC-affiliated) MPs had ignored the deal to sell 51% of Income Insurance to Allianz, Ng Chee Meng, NTUC secretary-general and PAP candidate for Jalan Kayu SMC, stated on 27 April that the deal was made "in good faith" and considered "reasonable" as it would have strengthened Income and safeguarded the interests of policyholders. In light of public concerns, Ng stated that he had initiated an internal review within NTUC Enterprise and pledged that the organisation would "do better". Chan Chun Sing, a former secretary-general of NTUC, also defended labour MPs against WP criticisms, stating that they were working to represent workers and raise "diverse" issues in Parliament. He rejected Singh's claim that NTUC served as a "trampoline" for losing PAP candidates, instead emphasising that voters assessed parties based on their ability to deliver jobs, wages, and price stability, and whether their proposals were realistic and financially sustainable. In a speech on 1 May, Wong expressed gratitude to union workers while warning against voting out key ministers and urging voters to judge the PAP fairly.

The PAP spent $9.4 million in its campaign. When interviewed on CNA Today, PAP activists stated that their campaign strategy involved prioritising resources in the eastern and north-eastern electoral hotspots, avoiding personal attacks in favour of policy discussions and leveraging incumbency strengths by emphasising constituency-level achievements. Felix Tan described Wong's first election campaign as "rather safe". While characterising the prime minister's speeches as lacking the gravitas of past leaders, he noted that Wong successfully highlighted the PAP's handling of the pandemic and its record on economic management.

==== Workers' Party ====
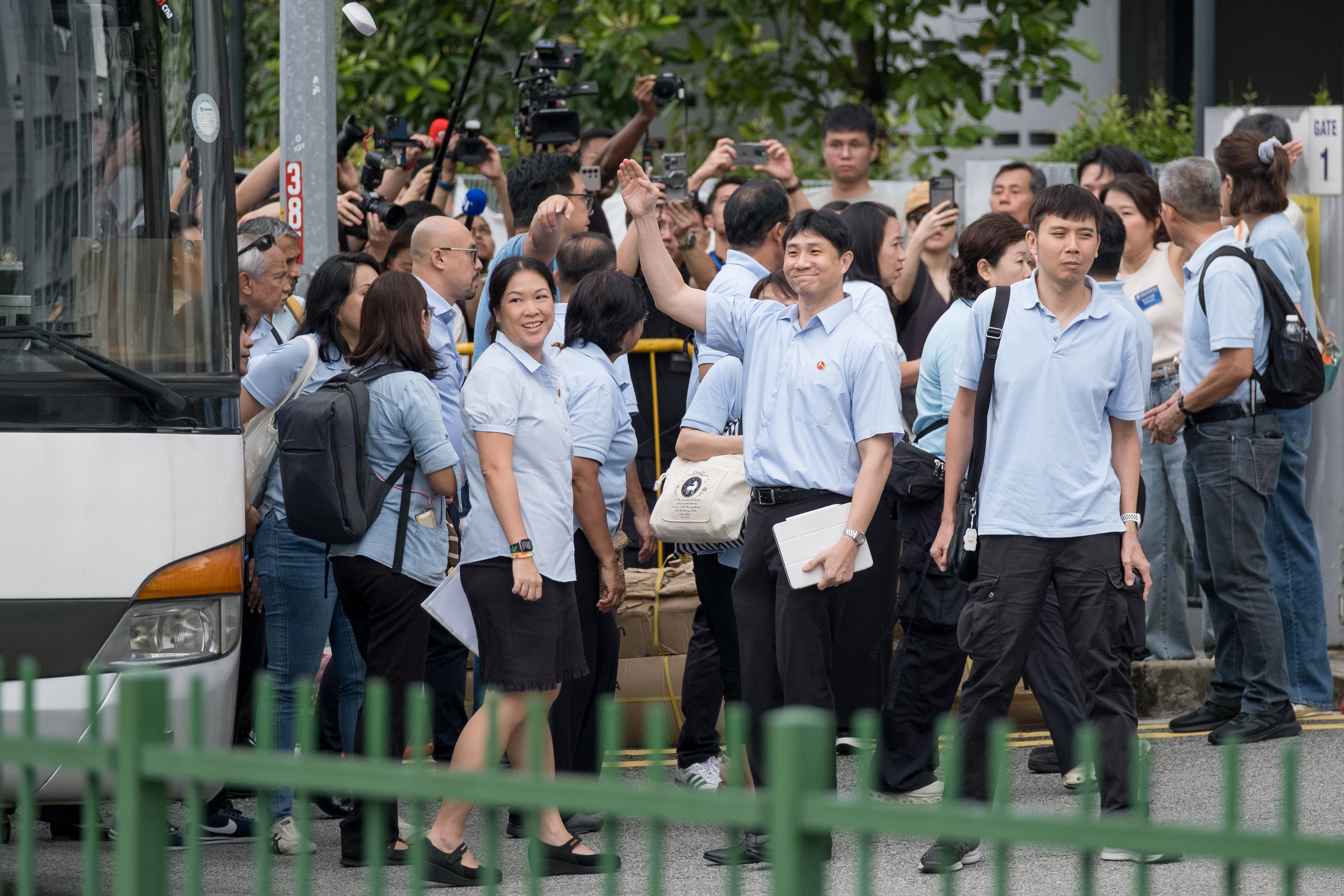
WP candidates Jamus Lim and He Ting Ru on Nomination Day

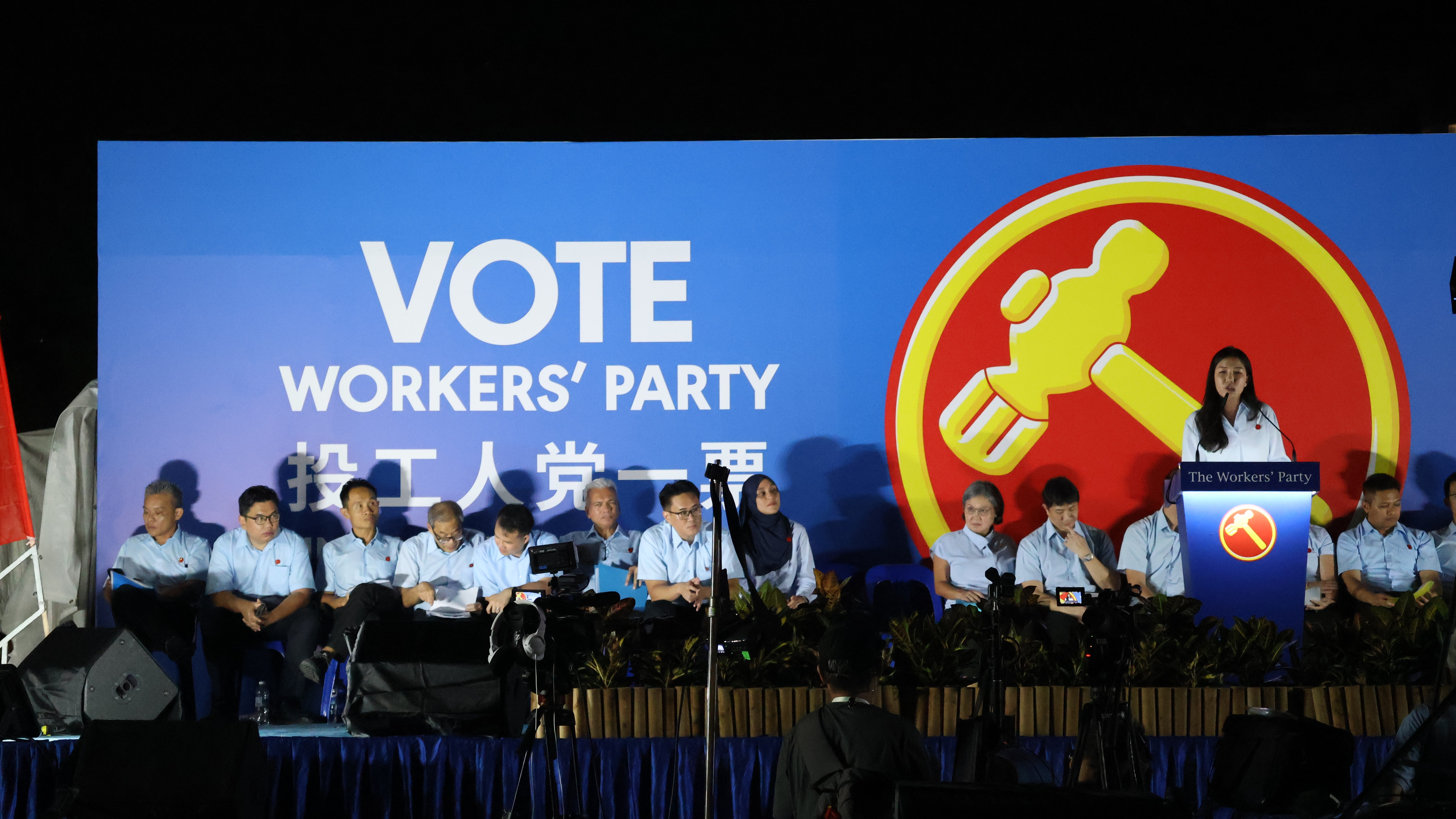
WP rally for Sengkang GRC on 24 April

The WP launched its campaign slogan "Working for Singapore", alongside a teaser video emphasising a need for political balance on 15 April. On 16 April, it claimed that 15 policy proposals, which it had previously advocated for, were adopted "in some form" by the government, covering areas like housing, transport, and employment. The PAP rejected this claim, asserting that the ideas originated from its own MPs, and accused the WP of aligning itself with government successes. On 17 April, the WP launched its manifesto, which included 125 policy proposals. To address the cost of living, the party called for exemptions of the Goods and Services Tax (GST) on essential items and the introduction of a minimum wage of S$1,600.

Regarding economic concerns, it proposed recognising and valuing unpaid household labour to correct a supposed perception that only paid work was meaningful. The WP also called for stronger leadership support in small and medium enterprises (SMEs) to improve talent attraction, the abolition of the statutory retirement age to give older workers more choice, and refinements to CPF policies, including allowing members to co-invest savings with GIC. On housing, it proposed using first-time buyers' median income to assess affordability, offering lower-priced 70-year Build-To-Order (BTO) flats with a 29-year lease extension option, a universal buy-back scheme for ageing flats, and greater transparency in land valuation processes. Other proposals included the repeal of the Internal Security Act, the enactment of a Freedom of Information Act, and formal recognition of the State of Palestine.

On 17 April, Singh confirmed that the WP would field candidates for less than a third of parliamentary seats, 14 of which were new. On nomination day, the WP fielded its candidates to contest 26 seats in the GRCs of Punggol, Sengkang, Aljunied, Tampines, and East Coast, and the SMCs of Jalan Kayu, Tampines Changkat, and Hougang. However, the WP decided not to contest Marine Parade–Braddell Heights GRC, causing a PAP walkover. Justifying the "difficult decision", Singh said that it was due to the party's lack of resources and extensive boundary changes to the constituency. The move was widely criticised by various other opposition parties, such as the PPP, NSP, and SPP, with SDP and PSP respecting their decision. This brought up further issues towards a lack of unity among opposition parties. Singh rebutted the criticisms the next day, insisting that the lineup had always been planned.

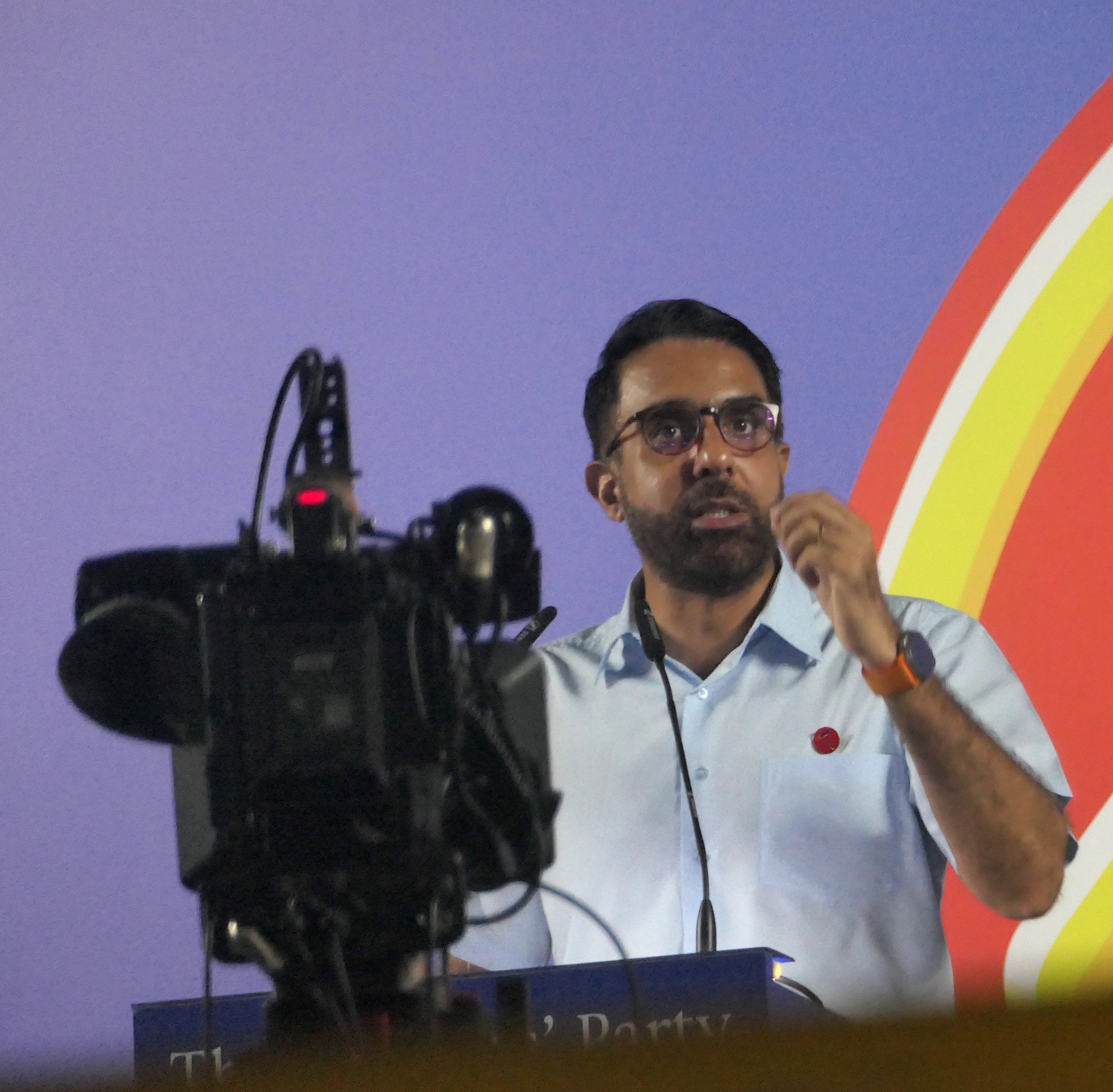
Singh addressing a rally in Punggol GRC on 28 April

Singh urged voters to support the WP despite global uncertainties on a 24 April rally, arguing that the WP had proven itself as a "force for good" during crises like the COVID-19 pandemic. He emphasised that a stronger WP presence in Parliament would contribute to a more rational and responsive political landscape. In response to a statement by Wong of a sizeable opposition already existing in Parliament, Singh argued that one-third of Parliament needed to consist of opposition MPs and that voters should compare PAP and WP backbenchers fairly. Jaipragas described the PAP–WP rivalry as a "clear arc", saying that it began "steadily" and "calmly" before coming to "a decisive sharpening at the midpoint". Nevertheless, he believed that the sharpened rhetoric and the absence of racial politics, fear-mongering, and intimidation marked a "healthy" step forward in Singapore's democratic development. ST political analysts characterised the WP's campaign strategy as "ambitious yet conservative" and yielding mixed outcomes. While consolidating itself in existing constituencies, it saw a decline in the contested vote share. The WP spent $1.6 million in its campaign.

==== Progress Singapore Party ====
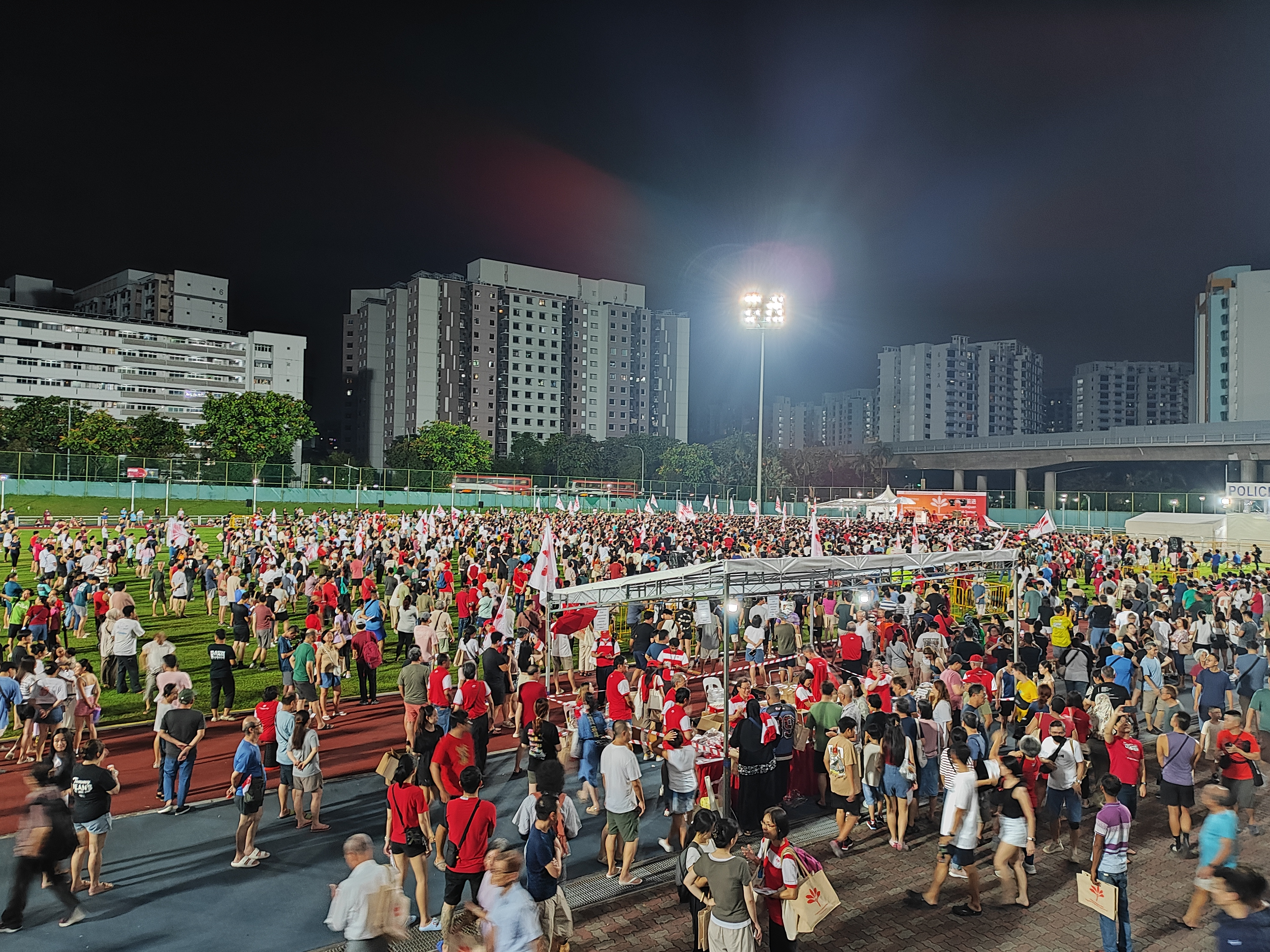
PSP rally at Pioneer SMC on 1 May 2025

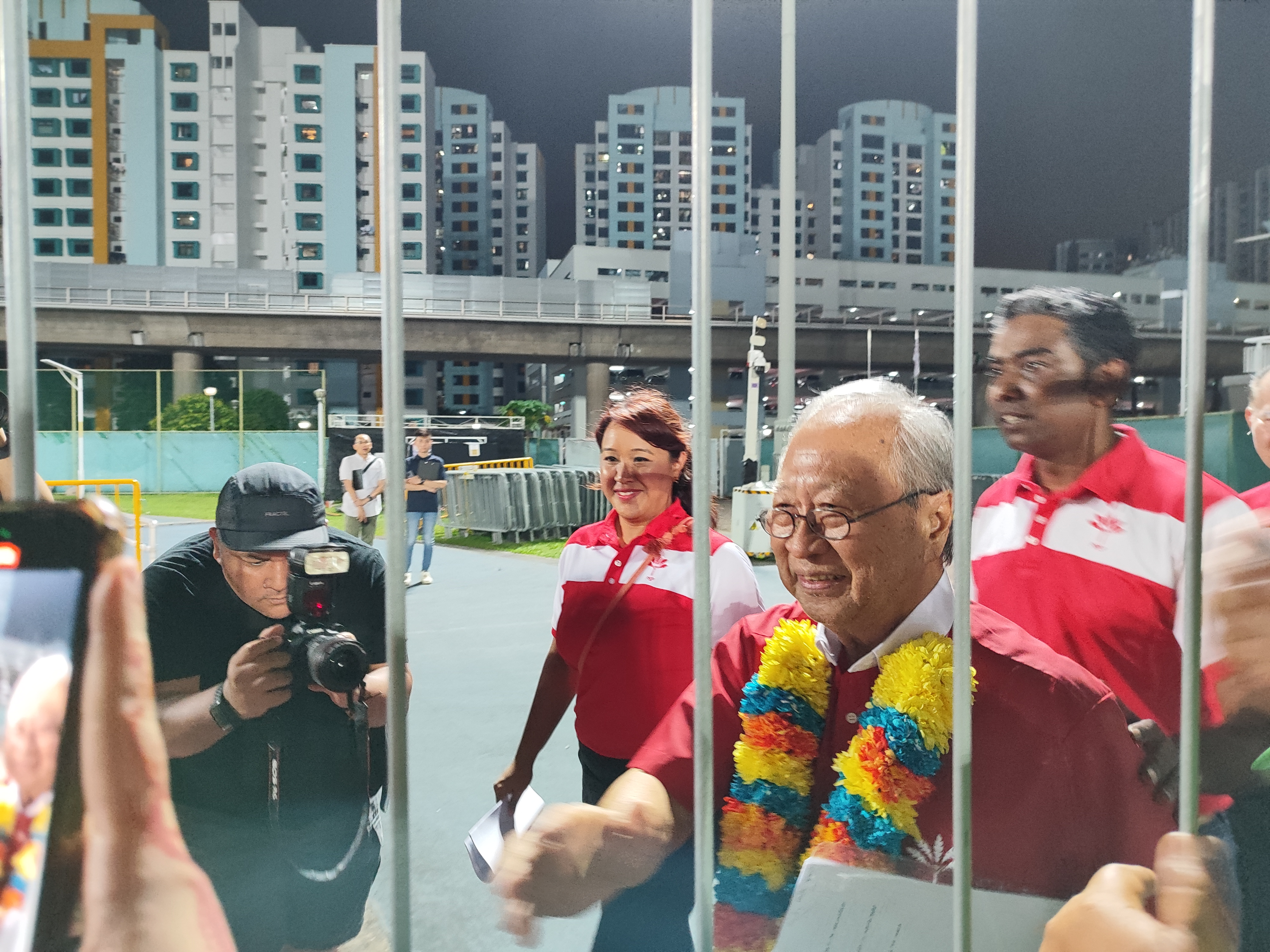
Tan Cheng Bock greeting supporters on a 1 May rally at Jurong West Sports Centre.

On 6 April, the PSP launched its election manifesto, titled "Progress for All", which included a call to revert the GST to 7%. It also proposed, among other measures to lower the cost of living, rent guidelines for commercial properties and a cap on hawker stall rental fees at $500 or 3% of revenue. The party also proposed eliminating "costly" social enterprise hawker centres. On healthcare, it advocated for centralised drug procurement as a cost-cutting measure and cash support for postpartum confinement. Economically, the party proposed to remove non-compete clauses for retrenched workers and mandate legally enforceable retrenchment benefits. It also called for shorter working hours, more paid leave and public holidays for better work-life balance, and equal parental leave for both parents. On housing, the PSP proposed replacing the existing Build-to-Order (BTO) system with its Affordable Homes Scheme, which excluded land costs for a flat unless it was resold. It also advocated to allow singles aged 28 to buy BTO and resale flats, a Millennial Apartments Scheme that would offer "quality" rental flats for youths, and in-advance construction of public housing. On immigration, the PSP proposed setting company-based quotas for Employment Pass (EP) holders. It also advocated to strengthen the Fair Consideration Framework and introduce a levy on EP holders in favour of Singaporean citizens.

The PSP fielded 13 candidates, down from the 24 in 2020, claiming a lack of manpower. It announced that it would contest the SMCs of Kebun Baru, Marymount, Pioneer, and Bukit Gombak, and the GRCs of Chua Chu Kang and West Coast–Jurong West. On the day after nominations, Leong challenged Desmond Lee, the leader of the PAP team for West Coast–Jurong West GRC, to a debate about public policies; the challenge was rejected. On 30 April, Leong also asked Lee to address HDB prices and lease decay; he was accused of making assertions with "little regards" while avoiding housing problems during rallies. During the PSP's first rally on 25 April, Tan and Leong claimed that the 4G leadership had "lost its way" and mentioned problems which supposedly arose in the previous term due to "a general decline in the standards". PAP minster Tan See Leng refuted the claims and advised the PSP to "keep up closely" on PAP policies and current trends while highlighting policies to further support his point. On 30 April, the PSP urged the release of police findings for the PAP–PSP altercation case before polling day; the government had reportedly not replied to prior communication regarding them. The PSP spent $441,548 in its campaign.

==== Singapore Democratic Party ====
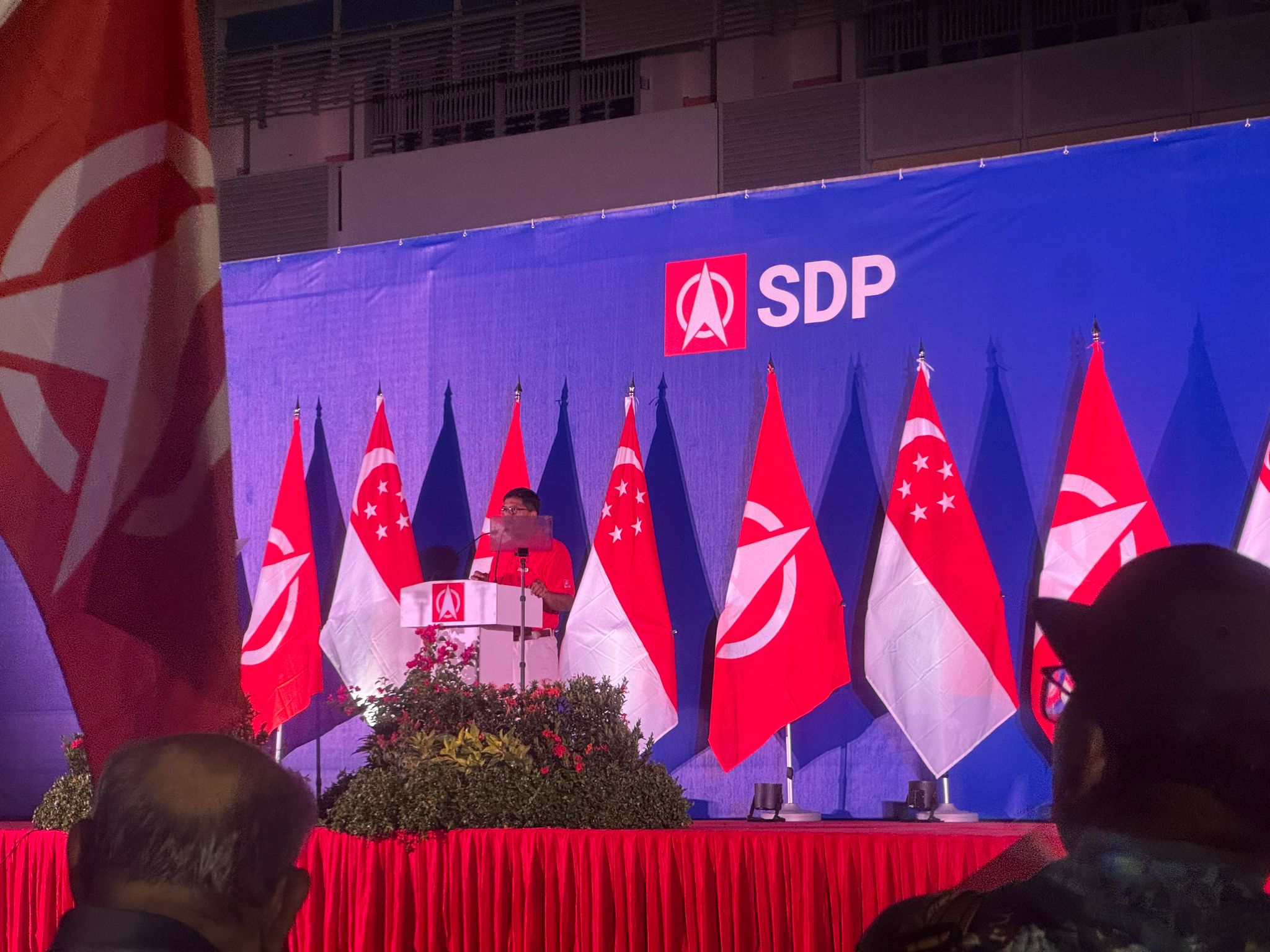
SDP rally in Bukit Panjang SMC on 25 April

The SDP criticised the "impossibly short" schedule between the release of the EBRC report and Parliament's dissolution, calling the election timing a "smash-and-grab tactic". As part of its "northern strategy", the party planned to contest in the GRCs of Sembawang, Marsiling–Yew Tee, and Holland–Bukit Timah, and the SMCs of Sembawang West and Bukit Panjang. On 19 April, the SDP launched its campaign slogan, "Thrive, Not Just Survive", campaigning for the reduction of GST to 5% and the introduction of a minimum wage act. It eventually fielded 11 candidates, without contesting Holland–Bukit Timah GRC. After Ong Ye Kung claimed that Chee Soon Juan, the secretary-general of the SDP, had "abandoned" Bukit Batok SMC by contesting Sembawang West SMC, Chee drew a comparison to Ong's shift to Sembawang GRC in 2015; he was part of the defeated PAP team for Aljunied GRC in 2011. In its final rally on 1 May, the party targeted the NTUC–PAP relationship and advocated for labour workers, in response to Wong's Labour Day rally. The SDP spent $583,440 in its campaign.

==== Singapore People's Party ====
The SPP responded to the issuance of the writ of election with a Facebook statement outlining its campaign priorities and outlined its focus on "pressing concerns of Singaporeans". It also called the election an "opportunity" for citizens to articulate their policy concerns, societal aspirations, and grievances. The party planned to contest in Bishan–Toa Payoh GRC and Potong Pasir SMC. On 19 April, it launched a manifesto which called for a minimum wage, a reduction of the duration of National Service (NS) to 18 months and a decrease in the eligibility age for singles purchasing public housing to 30. The SPP fielded five candidates in the constituencies it had planned to contest. While not hosting rallies, the party conducted walkabouts throughout the campaign to engage with residents.

==== National Solidarity Party ====
Secretary-general Spencer Ng said that the NSP was "unsurprised" about the election date; however, he called it "detrimental to the spirit of democracy". The party planned to contest in the GRCs of Sembawang and Tampines, as well as the SMCs formed from them (Sembawang West and Tampines Changkat) against the PAP in multi-cornered contests. On 20 April, it confirmed that it would not contest the SMCs, but would contest both GRCs in multi-cornered contests, as had been done in the 2020 general election. They also offered policy suggestions to champion if elected. The NSP spent $281,888 in its campaign.

==== Singapore United Party ====
The SUP planned to contest in Ang Mo Kio GRC and increased the frequency of its outreach. On Nomination Day, it fielded a five-member team for the GRC, led by secretary-general Andy Zhu. Speaking to the media after the end of nominations, Zhu questioned the PPP's rationale for contesting the GRC, saying that he had walked the ground as an RP candidate. Martinn Ho, a PPP member, countered that the later-founded SUP "came at the last minute".

==== Red Dot United ====
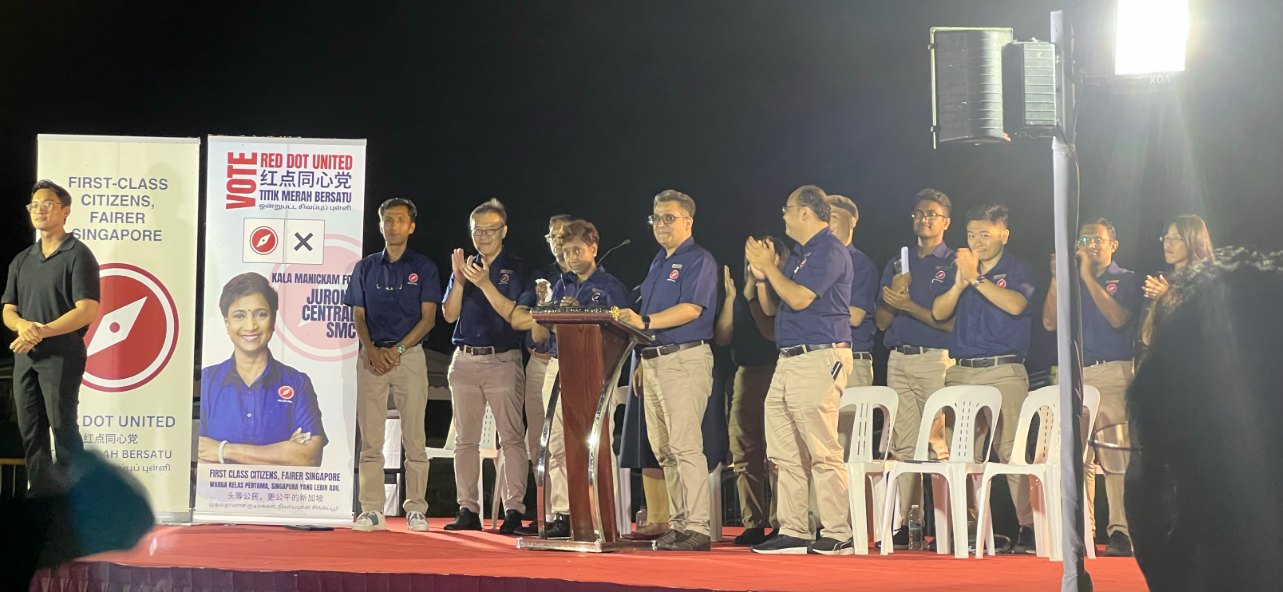
RDU candidates at a Jurong Central SMC rally on 30 April 2025

Secretary-general Philemon criticised the election timeline as "unfair and strategically engineered to favour the ruling party"; he argued that the acceptance of nominations on 23 April, which led to a campaign period ending on 1 May, the day of the May Day rally, had no "operational reason". He noted that the timing disadvantaged opposition parties, as they became unable to respond to announcements made during the rally before 2 May, Cooling-off Day. Despite these concerns, He affirmed RDU's readiness to contest the election. The party intended to contest Jurong East–Bukit Batok GRC, Jurong Central SMC, and Holland–Bukit Timah GRC. On nomination day, it fielded 15 candidates in the three constituencies, as well as Nee Soon GRC. The RDU spent $204,145 in its campaign.

==== People's Power Party ====
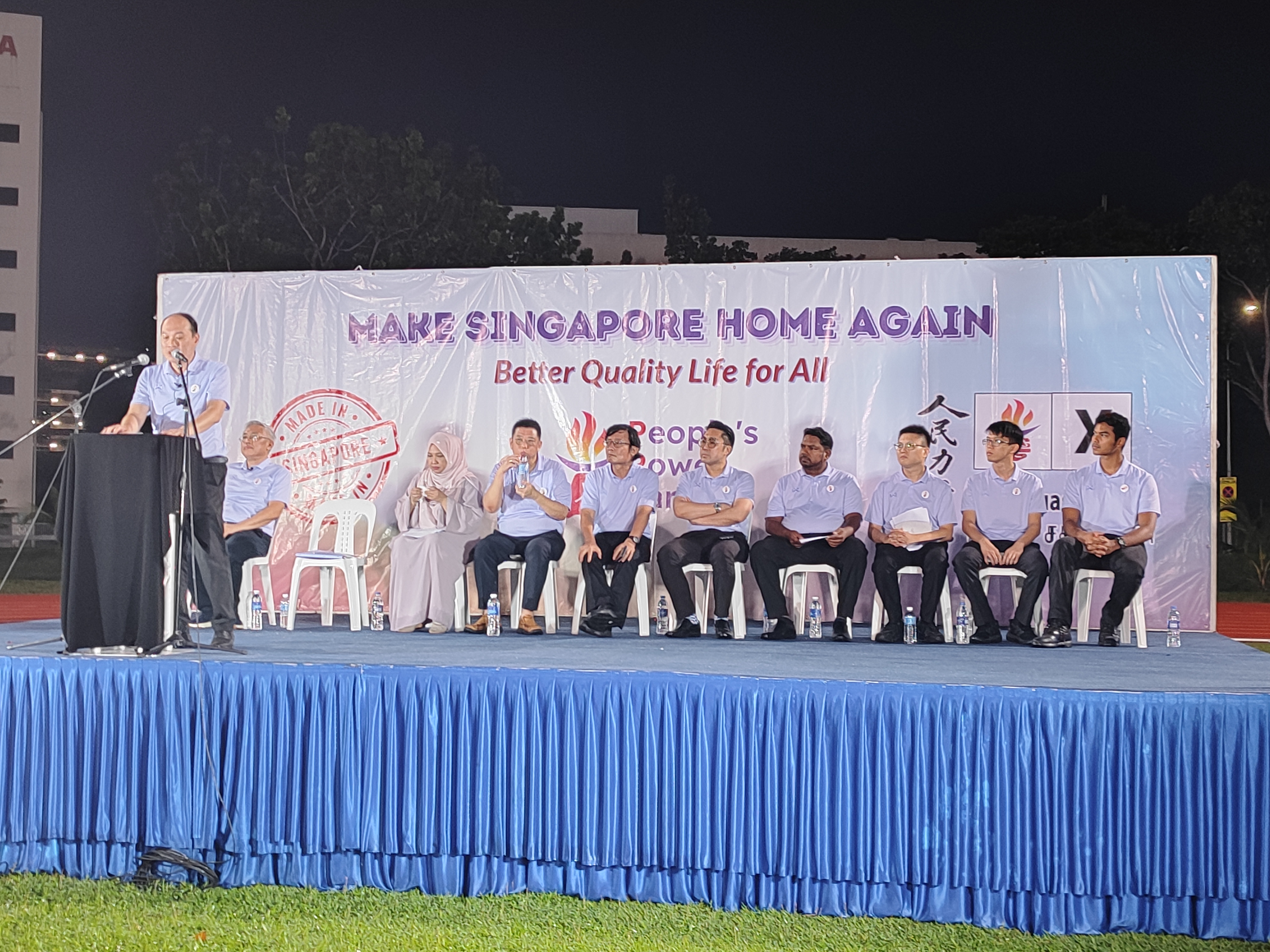
PPP candidates at a rally held at Yio Chu Kang Stadium on 26 April 2025

The PPP launched its manifesto on 4 April, titled "Make Singapore Home Again". It outlined tightened immigration policies, a revision of Central Provident Fund (CPF) contributions, and "pro-family policy proposals", such as a monthly payout for children from lower-income families. It also proposed to replace the existing first-past-the-post electoral system with proportional representation in parliamentary elections. The PPP planned to contest in the GRCs of Tampines and Ang Mo Kio. The two constituencies totalled 10 seats, and as with the NSP, both contests had multi-cornered fights. After nominations ended, the PPP put up election posters in Tampines Changkat SMC, violating the prohibition on election advertising outside of constituencies a party contests.

In response to public scrutiny over his road rage conviction in 2022, Samuel Lee, a PPP candidate for Ang Mo Kio GRC, apologised and appealed for public support; Sim backed him, describing Lee as a "responsible person" with "a good heart". In the party's final rally, Goh said that he aimed to convert the method of voting in GRCs from party block voting to proportional representation while criticising the PAP for recruiting civil servants and military professionals such as David Neo, which allegedly caused groupthink within the government. Having been noted for repeatedly attacking the WP throughout all PPP rallies, he also vowed to contest Marine Parade–Braddell Heights GRC in the subsequent general election, disregarding the outcome.

==== Singapore Democratic Alliance ====
SDA chairperson Desmond Lim said that the alliance was prepared with 200 volunteer polling and counting agents. To accommodate elderly residents, it planned to hold rallies online instead of physically. On 23 March, the alliance announced that it would contest Pasir Ris–Changi GRC and was negotiating with the WP on Punggol GRC; both had been formed from the split of Pasir Ris–Punggol GRC, an SDA stomping ground. On nomination day, the SDA decided against contesting Punggol GRC. In its series of videos, the SDA highlighted key issues such as high living costs, high HDB flat prices, unaffordable healthcare, and inadequate good job opportunities, and pledged to hold the government accountable in its expenditure while ensuring that "every young family [could] afford a home". It also proposed imposing a levy on Employment Pass holders, with the money used to fund a S$1,600 base allowance for full-time national servicemen. It also reaffirmed its commitment to addressing the concerns of residents of Pasir Ris–Changi GRC, pledging to offer a "choice" representing "a different path of compassion, fairness, and a Singapore where every heart beats with hope". The SDA spent $193,524 in its campaign.

==== People's Alliance for Reform ====
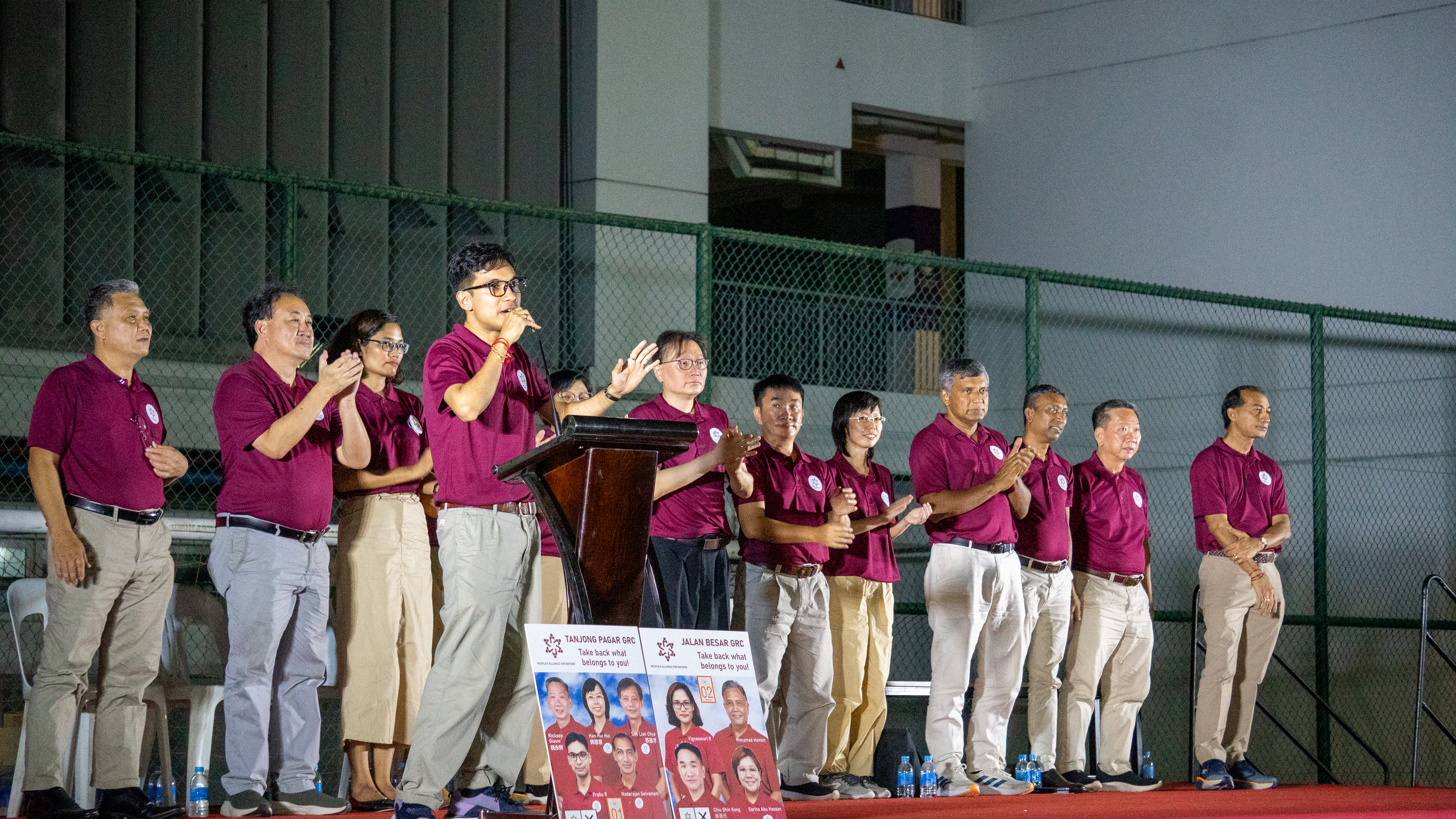
A People's Alliance for Reform rally in Jalan Besar GRC on 26 April

Secretary-general Lim Tean issued a statement endorsing the announcement of the general election and affirmed the PAR's readiness to contest. During a walkabout in Potong Pasir SMC on 16 April, he also stated that the PAR would seek free education, healthcare, and school meals for Singaporean children if elected. The PAR planned to contest in the GRCs of Jalan Besar and Tanjong Pagar, and the SMCs of Mountbatten, Potong Pasir, Queenstown, Radin Mas, and Yio Chu Kang. It eventually contested 13 seats, with Lim himself contesting Potong Pasir SMC against the SPP and PAP. However, it did not contest Mountbatten SMC. At a 26 April rally, Lim urged Singaporeans to vote for opposition candidates to challenge "unjust PAP policies", pledging to fight like "a tiger and a lion" in Parliament on issues like living costs, housing, jobs, and immigration. He also criticised the Founders' Memorial, a "bloated civil service", and "empty" Mass Rapid Transit stations as wasteful spending. Other PAR candidates at the rally proposed rent control and freezing land costs to address living costs. The PAR held its final rally on 1 May through Facebook.

==== Independent candidates ====
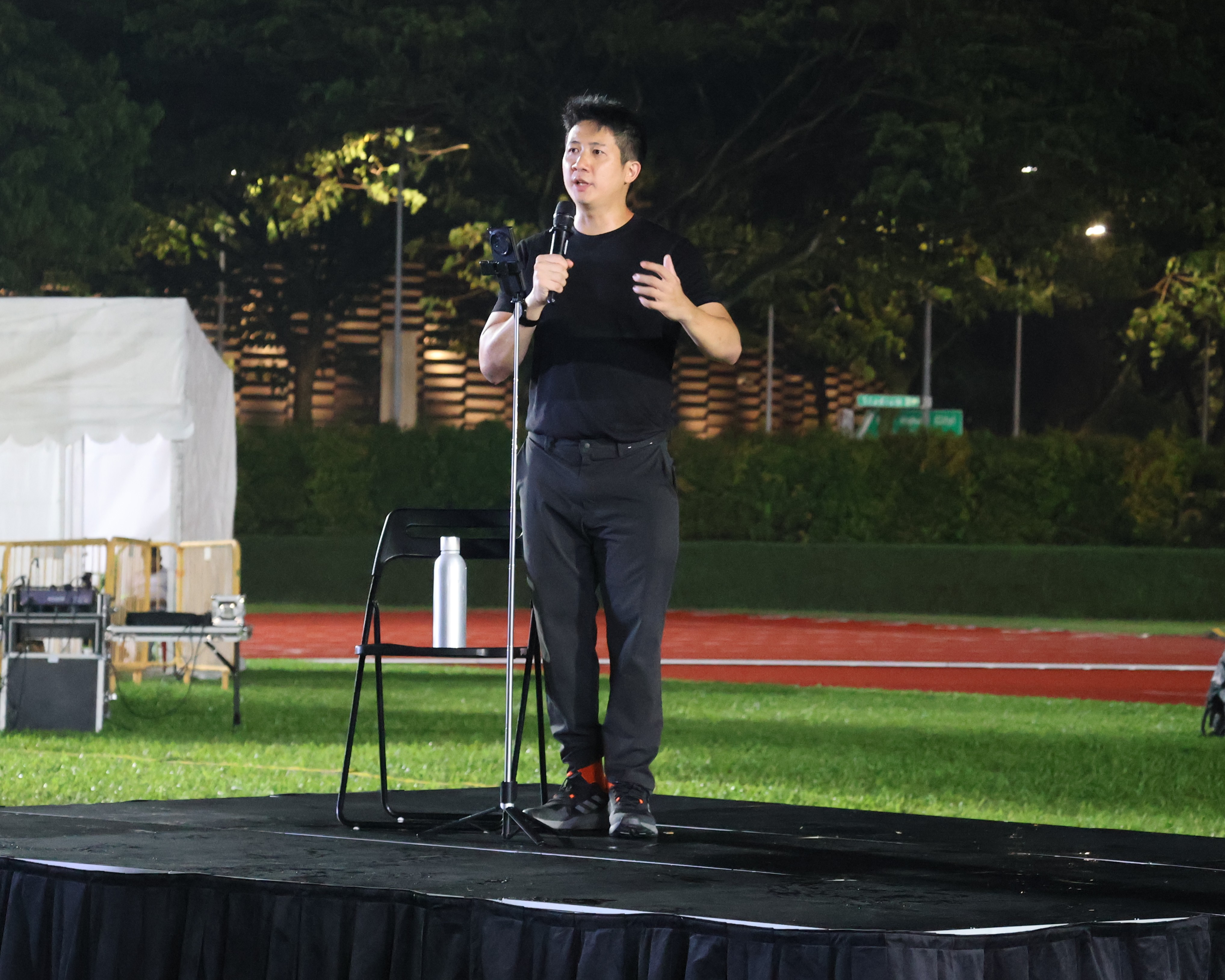
Independent candidate Jeremy Tan hosting a rally in Mountbatten SMC on 1 May

Two independent candidates ran in the election. Jeremy Tan, candidate for Mountbatten SMC and a retired Bitcoin investor, campaigned on investment in Bitcoin, the end of the use of HDB flats as retirement assets, and the introduction of an SGD-denominated Bitcoin exchange-traded fund to protect Singaporeans' savings. His opponent, PAP candidate Gho Sze Kee, criticised his policies as "impractical" and called Bitcoin a "wildly volatile" product. She added that the PAP "[did] not believe in gambling". Tan hosted his only rally on the final day of campaigning, where he called in response for Goh to disestablish the Mountbatten branch of Singapore Pools.

Darryl Lo, the other independent candidate who was contesting Radin Mas SMC, did not host any physical rallies. Instead, he distributed 15,000 flyers and put up 200 posters with the help of 12 volunteers as outreach. While admitting his lack of political presence, Lo said that he chose to run in Radin Mas SMC as there was no "credible opposition" in the constituency. He also promised to advocate for tougher penalties for drink driving, and to help more low-income families in the constituency qualify for the financial assistance scheme of the Ministry of Education (MOE). In addition, he supported allowing singles aged 21 and above to purchase HDB flats.

== Polling day ==
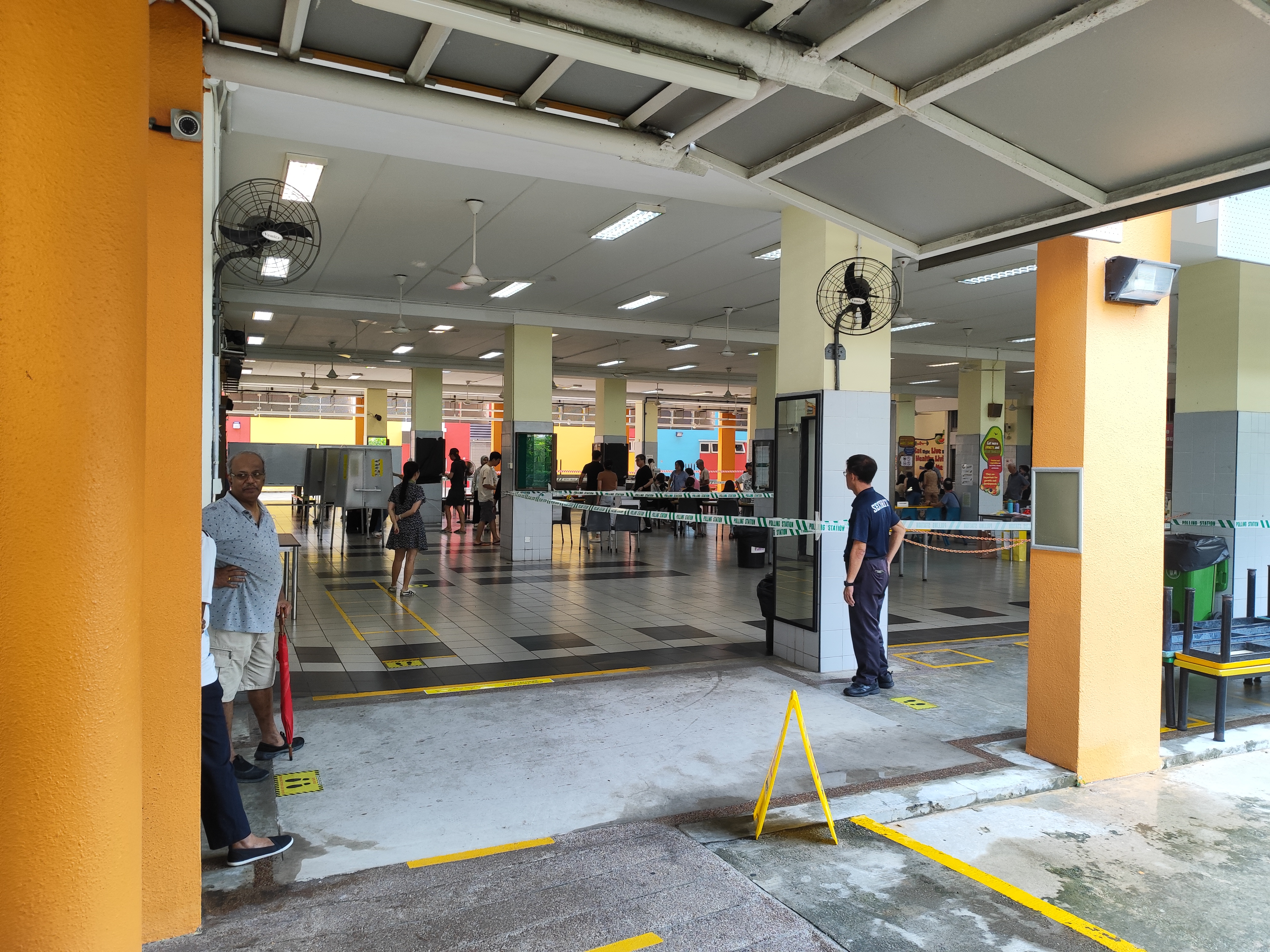
A polling station during the election

On polling day, 3 May 2025, polling stations were opened from 08:00 to 20:00, with 1,920 polling stations set up across Singapore. In addition, overseas Singaporeans could vote in 10 polling stations set up at Singapore's embassies, high commissions and consulates in Dubai, London, Washington, New York City, San Francisco, Beijing, Canberra, Hong Kong, Shanghai and Tokyo. A total of 18,389 Singaporeans registered to vote overseas, with the option to either vote in person or by post. Overseas polling in the first five foreign cities began a day earlier to ensure polls closed before Singapore's 20:00 deadline on polling day.

Voting is compulsory for all Singaporeans, except for those who are hospitalised, on holiday, or working or studying overseas on polling day. Absent voters are removed from the register and may subsequently apply for restoration through the SingPass app or ELD website with a S$50 processing fee (waived if valid reasons are given). For this election, restoration became available from 29 May. Under Section 35 of the Parliamentary Elections Act, polling day is a public holiday. Campaigning and election advertising are prohibited from the start of Cooling-off Day until the close of polling stations. When voting, voters are advised against wearing attire or carrying items to the polling station with images that could influence others or promote support for any political party, candidate, or group. Failure to comply may result in being turned away by election officials. Voting is conducted via a secret ballot. Each ballot paper contains a serial number that identifies it against counterfeiting and voter fraud.

At 12:00 of polling day, ELD reported that about 48% of the electorate had cast their ballots; by 17:00, this number had increased to 82%. Polls closed at 20:00, with 2,429,281 votes cast.

== Results ==
Since the 2015 general election, the ELD has released a sample count before the official results; the official reason is to curb speculation and reduce reliance on unofficial sources during the counting process. By 22:55 on polling day, all sample counts had been released, showing the PAP ahead in all constituencies except the WP-held Aljunied GRC, Sengkang GRC, and Hougang SMC. News outlets reported the full results the following morning, with the PAP securing 65.57% of the national vote, marking an improvement of over four percentage points from 2020. It won 87 out of 97 parliamentary seats, maintaining the two-thirds supermajority it had held since independence. The party won over 80% of the vote in three constituencies, with Queenstown SMC registering the highest vote share of 81.12%. A record 31 female candidates were elected, constituting approximately 32% of Parliament.

In addition to winning ten seats, the WP was offered and accepted two NCMP seats, as its candidates in Jalan Kayu SMC and Tampines GRC recorded the highest vote shares among defeated opposition candidates. The final overseas votes were tabulated on 15 May. According to ELD, 5,966 out of 8,091 overseas votes cast their ballots, while 7,808 out of 9,146 postal votes had been downloaded. 3,363 votes were accepted for counting out of the 6,097 that had been received in Singapore by the deadline stipulated on 13 May. Most vote shares were slightly changed, but the overall popularity vote was otherwise the same. In total, 9,329 votes were cast and 116 were rejected.

Out of 2,627,026 registered electors, 2,438,610 votes were cast, including 42,945 rejected ballots. At 92.47%, the election recorded Singapore's lowest voter turnout since 1968.

Popular vote
1. PAP (65.6%)
2. WP (15.0%)
3. PSP (4.88%)
4. RDU (3.96%)
5. SDP (3.72%)
6. Others (6.87%)
Elected seats won
1. 5 seats (PAP; uncontested) (5.15%)
2. 82 seats (PAP; contested) (84.5%)
3. 10 seats (WP) (10.3%)

Party	Votes	%	+/–	Seats	+/–
People's Action Party	1,570,803	65.57	+4.35	87	+4
Workers' Party	359,161	14.99	+3.77	12	+2
Progress Singapore Party	117,005	4.88	−5.30	0	–2
Red Dot United	94,955	3.96	+2.71	0	0
Singapore Democratic Party	89,053	3.72	−0.73	0	0
People's Alliance for Reform	60,207	2.51	New	0	New
Singapore Democratic Alliance	29,213	1.22	−0.27	0	0
Singapore People's Party	28,205	1.18	−0.34	0	0
Singapore United Party	15,874	0.66	New	0	New
People's Power Party	15,525	0.65	−0.35	0	0
National Solidarity Party	3,127	0.13	−3.62	0	0
Independents	12,537	0.52	+0.49	0	0
Total	2,395,665	100.00	–	99	+4
Valid votes	2,395,665	98.24			
Invalid/blank votes	42,945	1.76			
Total votes	2,438,610	100.00			
Registered voters/turnout	2,627,026	92.83			
Source: ELD

Opposition parties contested vote
Party	Votes
WP	50.06%
PSP	36.25%
SDA	32.32%
SDP	30.88%
Independents	29.37%
SPP	26.26%
RDU	23.36%
PAR	19.08%
SUP	10.85%
PPP	5.47%
NSP	1.19%

== Reactions ==
=== Domestic reaction ===
At a post-election press conference, prime minister Wong said that the results reflected a "clear and strong" mandate, placing Singapore in a better position to navigate uncertainties and multiracial issues. He described the outcome as a sign of public satisfaction while emphasising that the PAP did not take voters' support for granted and pledging to work harder. He also acknowledged the opposition's efforts in addressing key issues. Separately, president Tharman Shanmugaratnam said that Singaporeans "remain[ed] united in wanting the best future for the country" according to the results, noting the absence of political distrust or polarisation in countries such as Canada and Australia. Singh initially declined to speak to reporters regarding the election results. Nonetheless, in his victory speech for Aljunied GRC on 4 May, he pledged a more balanced parliament and that his team would continue to serve residents equally. Andre Low, who had contested Jalan Kayu SMC, said that he respected the result despite it being "not what [he and his supporters] hoped for". Meanwhile, supporters expressed surprise and disappointment as the party did not win any new seats. The WP congratulated the PAP for having a "strong mandate".

SDP leader Chee secured the party's best result of 46.81% in Sembawang West SMC. However, he failed to secure an NCMP seat, as the defeated WP candidates for Jalan Kayu SMC and Tampines GRC had outperformed him. He described the campaign as an "uphill battle" but affirmed that the SDP and other opposition parties would continue to collaborate and adapt their strategies for future elections. PSP leader Leong called the results "very shocking" as he acknowledged the party's loss across all six contested constituencies. He indicated that the party would reflect and review its strategy while aiming to regain public trust and continue serving Singaporeans. On 4 May, Tan Cheng Bock congratulated national development minister Desmond Lee, and his PAP team on their victory. He also thanked PSP voters, saying that their support was "never taken for granted". Leong congratulated Lee via Facebook on 7 May, and stated that the PSP's results did not signal the end of the party. On 10 May, Tan confirmed his retirement from electoral politics but said that he would remain in PSP and that the party "[was] not going to run away".

NSP leader Spencer Ng declared on 3 May that the NSP would become "more aggressive and vocal" against other opposition parties, saying that it risked being "overshadowed" amidst "an increasingly crowded opposition landscape". He stated that "opposition unity" was an illusion, and that the party would no longer adhere to "gentlemen's rules", alleging that other parties had exploited the "rules" for their own gain. PAR leader Lim Tean described the results as "disappointing not just for PAR but for the entire opposition" and vowed a stronger comeback in the next election. He also stated that the party would investigate "certain inexplicable matters", alleging that there were unsigned ballot box seals in Potong Pasir SMC. RDU leader Philemon described the results as encouraging and congratulated Wong, characterising PAP's win as a "heavy responsibility".

SDA leader Desmond Lim expressed his encouragement and motivation to continue community work, and outlined plans to enhance community engagement, refine policies, leverage social media, and build stronger coalitions with other parties to address constituents' issues. Independent candidates Jeremy Tan and Darryl Lo intended to use their platforms to continue engaging Singaporeans on local and national issues. Tan also planned to contest in the next election and pledged to advocate for low-income families in Mountbatten SMC and Marine Parade–Braddell Heights GRC. Lo, who outperformed PAR candidate Kumar Appavoo by 16 points, said that the result in Radin Mas SMC proved a desire among the electorate for more credible opposition candidates. A post-election survey by YouGov indicated that while most Singaporean voters were satisfied with the outcome, less than half of Gen Z voters approved of the PAP's election victory. The survey also found that only 37% of Gen Z respondents felt optimistic about the future under the new administration.

=== International reactions ===
Australian prime minister Anthony Albanese and Wong mutually congratulated each other for their respective election results. Wong also received congratulations from Malaysian prime minister Anwar Ibrahim. Indonesian president Prabowo Subianto congratulated Wong via X (formerly Twitter), regarding his win an example of "trust and stability and confidence", alongside vice president Gibran Rakabuming Raka. China's Ministry of Foreign Affairs spokesperson Lin Jian congratulated Wong on behalf of the Chinese government at a press conference. Japanese prime minister Shigeru Ishiba said he hoped to work more closely with Wong to strengthen the strong ties between Japan and Singapore. Indian prime minister Narendra Modi congratulated Wong on his "resounding victory in the general elections", and also stated that he looks forward to working closely with Wong to further advance the two countries' "comprehensive strategic partnership". New Zealand prime minister Christopher Luxon congratulated Wong via X on the election and noted that both nations "share a strong and enduring friendship".

Cambodian prime minister Hun Manet congratulated Wong and hailed their relationship a "highlighted the enduring friendship". Thai prime minister Paetongtarn Shinawatra also congratulated Wong on his "decisive election victory". United States Secretary of State Marco Rubio congratulated the PAP's victory, citing the strong and enduring strategic partnership between the two countries. President of the European Commission Ursula von der Leyen congratulated Wong and the PAP on their victory. United Kingdom Foreign Secretary David Lammy, Canadian prime minister Mark Carney, Estonian prime minister Kristen Michal, Luxembourg prime minister Luc Frieden, French president Emmanuel Macron, Ukraine president Volodymyr Zelenskyy, and Taiwan president Lai Ching-te sent their congratulations to Wong via X. Vietnamese prime minister Phạm Minh Chính also congratulated Wong.

=== Results analysis ===
ST analysts regarded the PAP's landslide victory as a "flight to safety". Additionally, analysts at ST and CNA believed that the results indicated a "strong mandate" for Wong's leadership. SMU professor Eugene Tan noted that the party's overall vote share increased, a reversal of the typical decline seen during a leadership transition. Political scientist Walid Jumblatt Abdullah believed that the strong electoral performance gave Wong "wide latitude" in forming his cabinet, with other commentators considering the PAP's leadership transition "complete".

Analysts interviewed on CNA suggested that the election results could signal a shift towards a two-party system in Singapore, with Tan highlighting the "increasingly crowded and fragmented opposition landscape". However, analysts differed on the WP's performance. Chong noted the party's increased vote share in its incumbent constituencies, and Teo Kay Key highlighted that the party secured over 40% of votes in all newly contested areas, both of which were cited as indicators of progress. However, former PAP MP Inderjit Singh argued that the WP's strong candidates remained overextended as it failed to secure additional GRCs. On Reuters, analysts believed that the WP had emerged as the leading challenger against the PAP's longstanding dominance. Associate Professor Michael Barr praised the party's disciplined approach and ability to attract strong candidates while building electoral experience. However, Gillian Koh noted that despite pulling ahead of other opposition parties, the WP remained far from mounting a serious challenge to the PAP, positioning Singapore closer to a "one-and-a-half party system".

Political observers on CNA also regarded the results as a "serious loss" for other opposition parties. The PSP lost its two NCMP seats; its contested vote share decreased from 41% to 36%. Political analyst Loke Hoe Yeong suggested that the PSP had been overdependent on Tan Cheng Bock's symbolic leadership, with NCMPs Poa and Leong failing to gain significant electoral momentum. Chong suggested that the party's reduced internet presence may have contributed to its decline, while Eugene Tan said that the PSP, being a newer party, failed to effectively convey a youthful appeal. Political obsevers also noted the party's struggle to recruit younger candidates and its misjudgment of the electorate's desire for policy debate. IPS academic adviser Tan Ern Ser said that the PSP's proposals could have appealed to some but seemed impractical to others, while observers noted that the party's leadership changes had hurt perceptions of its stability.

Tham Yuen-C, an ST writer, viewed the results as a rejection of poorly prepared "mosquito parties" by voters who favoured a "credible" opposition (e.g. the WP). She believed that they signalled a desire for gradual political change and higher standards in opposition politics. Analysts on CNA cited poor candidate quality, weak ground presence, and unclear messaging as key reasons for the non-WP opposition's poor performance, and suggested that they should consider consolidating or merging with larger opposition parties to remain relevant. Eugene Tan added that while RDU's performance was a "promising start", the party needed to grow further by broadening its appeal and recruiting candidates from diverse racial and social backgrounds. Various ST analysts also highlighted voters' rising expectations for strong parliamentary representation and effective municipal management. SUSS associate professor Walter Theseira noted that the WP retained support by improving estate management, while Eugene Tan described the PSP's dismissive attitude toward local governance as "untenable". Michelle Ang added that locally credible independent candidates had outperformed established opposition figures.

== Aftermath ==
=== Government formation ===
Wong stated that his immediate priority was to form the new cabinet, to be announced "in due course" through a press conference. The formation would be followed by a swearing-in ceremony. He also indicated that Ng Chee Meng, secretary-general of NTUC and MP for Jalan Kayu SMC, was likely to be included after his political comeback, citing key roles in past cabinets held by the leadership of NTUC. On 5 May, Wong also announced that Singh would remain the Leader of the Opposition. After a photograph of Ng and convicted money launderer Su Haijin circulated online, Ng requested on 6 May that Wong not assign him any cabinet position. He also apologised for his "disrespectful" remarks made to public servants at a 2017 MOE dialogue. On 19 May, the WP announced that Andre Low and Eileen Chong would accept the NCMP positions offered after the election; this was confirmed on the same day by the returning officer. Wong announced the line-up of his new cabinet on 21 May.

=== Opening of parliament ===
The 15th Parliament was opened on 5 September 2025 by President Tharman Shanmugaratnam, with the WP being the only opposition party. Seah Kian Peng was renominated as Speaker of Parliament while Indranee Rajah remained Leader of the House, as designated by Wong.

== See also ==
- Elections in Singapore
