= Zulfikar Shariff =

Singapore-born Australian political activist

- Born: Zulfikar bin Mohamad Shariff; September 28, 1971 (age 55); Singapore
- Citizenship: Australia (2000s–present) (Note: Until 2020, in violation of the Singaporean prohibition on multiple citizenship.); Singapore (1971–2020)
- Known for: Political activism and alledged extremism

Zulfikar bin Mohamad Shariff (Note: Jawi: ذوالفقار بن محمد شريف) (born 28 September 1971) is a Singaporean-born Australian author, political activist and dissident who founded The Inquiry, an online podcast channel that is focused on Malay–Muslim issues. It was geo-restricted in Singapore for allegedly causing racial tensions. In 2016, he was detained under the Internal Security Act (ISA) of Singapore on allegations of terrorism-related activity.

== Early life and education ==
Zulfikar was born in Singapore on 28 September 1971. He was a PhD candidate at La Trobe University but did not graduate, being unable to finish due to his detention in Singapore.

== Activism ==
While in Singapore, Zulfikar and two of his friends founded Fateha.com (Fateha) in the early 2000s, a website for Muslim's woes and concerns in Singapore. He also advocated for the rights of Muslim children to wear a hijab in primary and secondary schools. In 2002, Zulfikar fled Singapore to Australia via Malaysia to escape an investigation for criminal defamation. He had previously contributed in a Fateha article targeting individuals associated with the People's Action Party (PAP) such as Lee Kuan Yew, Yaacob Ibrahim and Ho Ching. In response, Zulfikar alleged that such investigations was a "political persecution" attempt by the PAP. He took up Australian citizenship soon after, despite the fact that Singaporean nationality law does not permit multiple citizenship.

In July 2016, upon his return to Singapore, Zulfikar was detained under the ISA for allegedly supporting the Islamic State. He was also additionally charged in court under the Passports Act for not disclosing his Australian citizenship when applying for a renewal of his Singapore passport in 2013. He was subsequently repatriated to Australia in 2020 after renouncing his Singaporean citizenship. After his repatriation, Zulfikar started The Inquiry, an online podcast channel that touches issues regarding Malay–Muslim issues in Singapore. Singapore's Ministry of Home Affairs ordered Meta, Telegram and TikTok to restrict access to the content in Singapore, which was observed.

== Personal life ==
In 2025, his daughter Sayyida Nafeesa Zulfikar was killed in a car crash in Melbourne.
