= Gan Siow Huang =

Singaporean politician

The Honourable Gan Siow Huang PPA(P)
- 颜晓芳
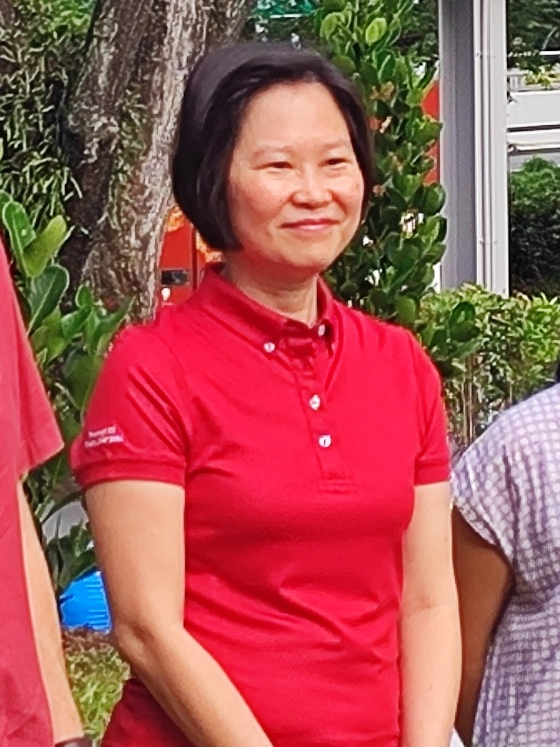
- Gan in 2025

Member of the Singapore Parliament for Marymount SMC
- Incumbent
- Assumed office 10 July 2020
- Preceded by: Constituency established
- Majority: 2020: 2,230 (10.08%); 2025: 8,767 (41.46%)

Personal details
- Born: 28 September 1974 (age 52) Singapore
- Party: People's Action Party
- Spouse: Lee Jek Suen
- Children: 3
- Education: London School of Economics (BS); New Zealand Defence College; Massachusetts Institute of Technology (MBA)
- Occupation: Politician

Military service
- Branch/service: Republic of Singapore Air Force
- Years of service: 1993–2020
- Rank: Brigadier-General
- Commands: Chief of Staff – Air Staff; Commander, Air Power Generation Command; Head, Joint Manpower Department; Commander, Air Surveillance and Control Group; Commanding Officer, 203 Squadron

Gan Siow Huang (Note: Chinese: 颜晓芳; pinyin: Yán Xiǎofāng) PPA(P) (born 28 September 1974) is a Singaporean politician and former brigadier-general who has served as Minister of State for Foreign Affairs and Minister of State for Trade and Industry since May 23, 2025, she has been the Member of Parliament (MP) for Marymount Single Member Constituency (SMC) since 2020.

Before entering politics, Gan served in the Republic of Singapore Air Force (RSAF) and attained the rank of Brigadier-General, becoming the first woman to hold a general rank in the Singapore Armed Forces (SAF). She served as Chief of Staff – Air Staff between 2019 and 2020.

Gan made her political debut in the 2020 general election as a PAP candidate in Marymount SMC, defeating Ang Yong Guan from the Progress Singapore Party (PSP) with 55.04% of the vote. After being elected, she was appointed Minister of State for Education and Manpower.

== Education ==
Gan was educated at Raffles Girls' School and Victoria Junior College before she was awarded the Singapore Armed Forces Merit Scholarship (Women) in 1993 to study at the London School of Economics, from which she graduated in 1996 with a Bachelor of Science degree in economics. She had also attended the command and staff course at the New Zealand Defence College in 2003.

Gan subsequently went on to complete a Master of Business Administration degree in 2010 under the Sloan Fellows programme at the MIT Sloan School of Management.

== Military career ==
Gan started her career as a weapon systems officer in the Republic of Singapore Air Force. Throughout her military career, she held various command and staff appointments in the Air Force, including Commanding Officer of the 203 Squadron, Commander of Air Surveillance and Control Group, and Head of the Joint Manpower Department in the Ministry of Defence. She also received the Public Administration Medal (Silver) (Military) in 2013.

On 1 July 2015, Gan was promoted to the rank of Brigadier-General, becoming the first woman to hold a general rank and the highest ranking female officer in the Singapore Armed Forces. In a speech at a Convention on the Elimination of All Forms of Discrimination Against Women forum held on 3 October 2015, Low Yen Ling cited Gan as "one notable example who smashed the 'brass ceiling' to become the first female general in the Singapore Armed Forces".

Gan succeeded Brigadier-General Neo Hong Keat as Commander of the Air Power Generation Command on 5 October 2016. In July 2019, she was appointed Chief of Staff – Air Staff, succeeding Brigadier-General Tommy Tan Ah Han. On 1 March 2020, she resigned as Chief of Staff – Air Staff to stand for election in the 2020 general election.

== Political career ==
On 26 June 2020, Gan was officially introduced as a People's Action Party (PAP) candidate contesting in the 2020 general election. She contested in Marymount SMC against Ang Yong Guan of the Progress Singapore Party (PSP) and won with 55.04% of the vote, thus becoming the Member of Parliament representing Marymount SMC.

On 25 July 2020, Gan was appointed as Minister of State for Education and Minister of State for Manpower.

During 2025 general election, Gan contested in Marymount SMC against Jeffrey Khoo of the Progress Singapore Party (PSP) and won with 70.73% of the vote, thus becoming the Member of Parliament representing Marymount SMC.

Gan has served as the Chairman of the Bishan-Toa Payoh Town Council (BTPTC) since 2026 and previously serving as its Vice-Chairman from 2020 to 2025.

== Personal life ==
Gan is married to Lee Jek Suen, a former Republic of Singapore Navy officer who now works at Jurong Port. They have three children. Gan is also a volunteer with the Girl Guides Singapore and a member of its executive committee in 2016 and 2017.

== Notes ==
Parliament of Singapore
New constituency	Member of Parliament for Marymount SMC; 2020–present	Incumbent
