= Singaporeans First =

Defunct political party in Singapore

- Chinese name: 国人为先; Guórén Wéixiān
- Malay name: Warga Diutamakan ورݢ داوتاماكن
- Tamil name: சிங்கப்பூரர்களுக்கு முன்னுரிமை Ciṅkappūrarkaḷukku Muṉṉurimai
- Chairman: Ang Yong Guan
- Founder: Tan Jee Say
- Founded: 25 May 2014
- Dissolved: 25 June 2020
- Split from: Singapore Democratic Party
- Colours: Red; Blue

Website
- https://www.facebook.com/SingaporeansFirst/

Singaporeans First (abbreviation: SingFirst) was a political party in Singapore founded on 25 May 2014 by Tan Jee Say. The party was dissolved on 25 June 2020.

== History and political development ==
=== Formation and contests ===
After SingFirst was founded in May 2014, Tan used a stylised adaptation of the simple heart logo, similar to the one he had used when he campaigned for the presidential election in 2011. Tan led his 10-member Central Executive Committee (CEC), whose members included a former SDP candidate Ang Yong Guan.

On 22 March 2015, SingFirst unveiled a new 12-member CEC with five new faces at its inaugural dinner. Assistant secretary-general Loke Pak Hoe, assistant treasurer Fatimah Akhthar, and Fahmi Rais stepped down from the CEC.

In September 2015, the party participated in their first general election, where they contested Jurong and Tanjong Pagar Group Representation Constituencies (GRC), against the People's Action Party (PAP). The party obtained 20.72% and 22.29% of the vote share, respective to each constituency, and was defeated by the PAP.

In July 2018, the party was among seven political parties (Reform Party, Singapore Democratic Party, People's Power Party, Democratic Progressive Party, National Solidarity Party (NSP) and Peoples Voice Party (PV)), in a meeting led by former PAP MP Tan Cheng Bock, on the possibility of forming a coalition for the next election.

In March 2020, SingFirst alongside People's Power Party, Reform Party and Democratic Progressive Party applied to join the Singapore Democratic Alliance.

=== Dissolution ===
The party chairman, Ang Yong Guan, appeared in a PSP video produced before 7 April 2020, and was subsequently revealed to be PSP's candidate for Marymount SMC for the 2020 general election in the period between the dissolution of Parliament and nomination day. On 25 June 2020, Tan dissolved SingFirst, claiming that it would be in the best interests of a united opposition, to avoid multi-cornered fights between more than two parties in the same constituency. Tan subsequently contested under the SDP banner for the Holland–Bukit Timah GRC in the 2020 general election.

== Leadership of SingFirst ==
No	Years	Name
1	2014 to 2020	Tan Jee Say

== Manifesto ==
SingFirst aimed to abolish the Goods and Services Tax (GST) and increase social spending.

In its manifesto for the 2015 election, the party stated it would:

- Restructure the economy by making it much less dependent on cheap low-skilled foreign labour as it depresses wage levels, lowers overall productivity, sustains low-skill industries and adds to over-crowding. It will review the need to give very favourable foreign-worker quotas to certain industries that are highly dependent on foreign workers since this special treatment is unfair to other industries and distorts manpower policies. For example, shipyards employ 100,000 foreign workers out of a total workforce of 120,000.
- Place high priority on developing local enterprises, for example, small and medium enterprises into major regional or global firms. Grants for development capital will be provided to help them strike out into new areas especially in the high-tech industry. The party has identified two sectors that are sustainable over the long term: education and healthcare. SMEs can develop their expertise in these areas. The party intends to deal with rising rental costs that have affected these businesses.
- Encourage priority to the employment of Singaporeans across all sectors but particularly at PMET and senior management levels. Foreigners should only be hired where specialist skills are missing in Singaporeans. Government-linked companies should start the trend by enrolling more Singaporeans in the executive and management positions.
- Review policies that put Singaporeans at a disadvantage compared to foreign personnel working in Singapore. On the national-service obligation of Singaporean men, the party will review the two-year national-service period in light of technological progress and new organisational methods and training, so the military training period can be shortened meaningfully.

Tan Jee Say said in a televised forum on 1 September that his party did not want the government to issue S Passes to foreigners. Amongst the passes that the Ministry of Manpower (Singapore) issues, the S Pass allows mid-level skilled personnel to work in Singapore. Applicants need to earn at least S$2,200 a month and have the relevant qualifications and work experience.

== Electoral performance ==
Election	Leader	Votes	%	Seats					NCMPs	Position	Result
Election	Leader	Votes	%	Contested			Total	+/–	NCMPs	Position	Result
Election	Leader	Votes	%	Seats	Won	Lost	Total	+/–	NCMPs	Position	Result
2015	Tan Jee Say	50,867	2.25%	10	0	10	0 / 89	Steady	0 / 3	▲6th	No seats
