= Winsemius =

Winsemius is a Dutch surname. Notable people with the surname include:

- Albert Winsemius (1910–1996), Dutch economist, economic advisor for Singapore
- Pieter Winsemius (born 1942), Dutch politician and government minister
