= Tan Jee Say =

Politician, businessman, civil servant

- 陈如斯
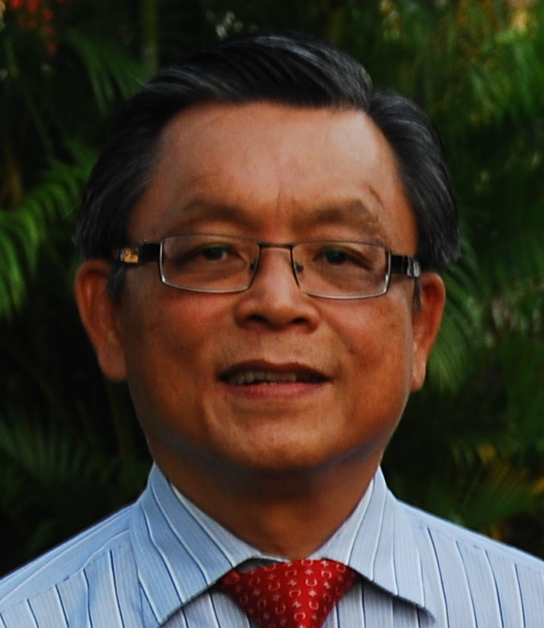
- Tan in 2011

Secretary-General of Singaporeans First
- In office 25 May 2014 – 25 June 2020
- Chairman: Ang Yong Guan
- Preceded by: Position established
- Succeeded by: Position abolished

Personal details
- Born: 12 February 1954 (age 72) Colony of Singapore
- Party: Singapore Democratic Party (2011–2011) (2020–present)
- Other political affiliations: Independent (2011–2014); Singaporeans First (2014–2020)
- Spouse: Patricia Khoo Phaik Ean
- Children: 4
- Education: University College, Oxford (BA)

Tan Jee Say
- Traditional Chinese: 陳如斯
- Simplified Chinese: 陈如斯
Transcriptions
Standard Mandarin
- Hanyu Pinyin: Chén Rúsī

Tan Jee Say (Chinese: 陈如斯; pinyin: Chén Rúsī; born 12 February 1954) is a Singaporean politician and former civil servant.

He stood in a four-cornered fight for the 2011 presidential election. He was unsuccessful in his bid, losing with 25.04% of the votes to Tony Tan.

He founded the defunct political party, Singaporeans First which was disbanded prior to the 2020 general election.

== Education ==
Tan graduated from University College, Oxford with a Bachelor of Arts degree in philosophy, politics and economics (PPE) under the Government Overseas Merit Scholarship.

== Career ==
Tan had worked in the Civil Service for 11 years, including six years in the Ministry of Trade and Industry (MTI) from 1979 to 1985, before leaving as Deputy Director for Economic and Manpower Planning. During that period, he served as the secretary to Albert Winsemius, the government's economic adviser, concurrently. He went on to serve as the principal private secretary to Deputy Prime Minister Goh Chok Tong from 1985 to 1990.

Tan left the Civil Service in 1990 and entered the finance industry, where he has worked for more than a decade. Tan became Director of Corporate Finance at Deutsche Morgan Grenfell in 1990. He subsequently became Head of Peregrine Capital Singapore in 1994. He was the regional managing director for AIB Govett, an asset management company, from 1997 to 2001. Tan was subsequently appointed as Regional Director for ACCA in the Asia-Pacific region in 2006.

== Political career ==
Tan joined the Singapore Democratic Party (SDP) in April 2011 due to his "dismay" at Singapore's society and economy. During the 2011 general election, Tan contested the Holland–Bukit Timah GRC.

On the economy, Tan proposed S$60 billion to be set aside for a National Regeneration Plan. He called the sum "small change" compared to the government's supposed surpluses and losses in investments. The "small change" label was criticised by Deputy Prime Minister Teo Chee Hean and Minister for Community Development, Youth and Sports Vivian Balakrishnan, who said Tan's plans could put 500,000 jobs at risk.

Tan proposed that Singapore shift its focus away from manufacturing to the services sector. He argued that "we should not promote manufacturing because it requires a lot of land and labour. But Singapore is short of land and labour... We want to promote, we want to use our land, limited tax incentives... promoting services sector such as medical, health sectors, education, creative industries." Tan's suggestion was rebuked by Minister Mentor Lee Kuan Yew, who questioned his qualifications. Lee said the manufacturing sector is more "steady" compared to the "volatile" services sector. In response, Tan pointed out that his proposals were endorsed by Lord Butler of Brockwell, British Cabinet Secretary from 1988 to 1998. He disputed Lee's assertion that the manufacturing sector is more steady by citing a 2009 study by the Ministry of Trade and Industry which concluded that the services sector as a whole has a relatively low volatility.

During the campaign, Senior Minister Goh Chok Tong claimed that Tan left the Civil Service because Goh "did not think he could make it as a permanent secretary." Tan refuted Goh's claims and explained that he had intended to leave the Civil Service in 1984 after his scholarship bond ended, but was persuaded by Goh to become the latter's principal private secretary. After serving as Goh's principal private secretary for five years, Tan said he stated his intent to leave again, which Goh accepted.

Tan's team, composed of Vincent Wijeysingha, Ang Yong Guan and Michelle Lee Juen, lost to the PAP team led by Vivian Balakrishnan, which won 60.1% of the vote.

=== Singaporeans First ===
On 25 May 2014, Tan established a new political party, Singaporeans First, which pledged to put "Singaporeans at the heart of the nation". He is now advocating abolishing GST. When Tan was asked by Chris of the TR Emeritus that Singaporeans saw him as an opportunist, he responded that in Singapore there are very few platforms for alternative views to be expressed as the public media is dominated by the government and that Singaporeans heard nothing but the views of the government on issues as though there is only one view in the world. He added that because of this, the general election and the presidential election are important opportunities and important forums to tell Singaporeans what alternative views and solutions there are. The party did not fare long however, as he dissolved Singaporeans First on 25 June 2020.

=== Return to Singapore Democratic Party ===
On 29 June 2020, the eve of Nomination Day for the 2020 general election, Tan made a last minute bid to party secretary-general Chee Soon Juan to rejoin the SDP. His appeal was successful and he contested as an SDP candidate in Holland–Bukit Timah GRC. However, his SDP team lost to the PAP team led by Minister for Foreign Affairs Vivian Balakrishnan.

== 2011 presidential election ==
In July 2011, Tan resigned from the SDP and announced his candidacy for the 2011 presidential election.

=== Platform ===
He campaigned on a platform of being a candidate who is "clear[ly]" independent from the ruling PAP and declared that he would be the "conscience of the nation." Tan said he could "provide real and effective checks and balances on the excesses of the PAP government" since the President has veto power in some key areas. He cited the country's new casino industry (referring to the Integrated Resorts) as an example of PAP "[losing] its moral compass."

In addition, Tan said he wanted to "raise the profile of all non-PAP forces" in preparation for the next general election. He added that he aimed to show Singaporeans that the office of the president "is not a shoo-in for the PAP."

Tan also emphasised his economics background and policymaking experience.

He pledged to lobby the government to reduce its role in private business to encourage entrepreneurship. He explained: "[I]t is not the business of Government to be in business... I think Singaporeans can get better service from people who are motivated to serve, not because they are civil servants." Among his proposals are to gradually sell Temasek Holdings' assets to the private sector and invest the earnings in education and health infrastructure. Tan estimated that Temasek Holdings accounted for 60 per cent of Singapore's gross domestic product, but this claim was discredited by the company, which put the figure at 10 per cent.

Tan also hoped for a review on taxes, saying: "The fact that you have accumulated huge surpluses every year... is excess of revenue over expenditure. So by having more revenue than necessary to finance government service, you are overtaxing the people. I think that's wrong."

Tan called for a minimum wage in Singapore, saying that not having one would be "unconscionable." He also said the government's "hard-nosed approach" had left some Singaporeans behind: "Whoever wants a job will get a job, whoever works enough will have a good living – that's not true. There are people who, despite all that they do, cannot make it in life here."

His campaign symbol (which is printed on the ballots) was a heart, which he said represents "empathy and compassion."

=== Eligibility ===
Doubts were initially raised over his eligibility as a presidential candidate as he did not meet the criterion of being the chief executive officer of a Singapore company with a paid-up capital of S$100 million. Tan said he was CEO with the title of regional managing director of AIB Govett Asia which managed total assets in excess of S$100 million which, in his view, would make it equivalent to managing a company with a paid-up capital of S$100 million.

He also pointed out that he had met the alternate criterion of having served for not less than three years in "any other similar or comparable position of seniority and responsibility in any other organisation or department of equivalent size or complexity in the public or private sector."

He submitted his application to the Elections Department on 4 August under the latter criterion and was awarded a certificate of eligibility (COE) a week later, along with Tony Tan, Tan Cheng Bock and Tan Kin Lian. The awarding of the COE to Tan Jee Say was seen as a liberal interpretation of the eligibility criteria by the Presidential Elections Committee.

=== Campaign ===
Tan was the only eligible candidate with no previous ties to the PAP. He is regarded as the most partisan candidate having participated in a general election under the SDP. His bid was endorsed by opposition politicians Nicole Seah, Vincent Wijeysingha, Jeanette Chong-Aruldoss, Steve Chia, and candidate-hopeful Andrew Kuan (who was not awarded a COE).

His interpretation of the president's role was challenged by Law Minister K. Shanmugam, who pointed out that the president acts only on the advice of the government and has veto power only in specific areas. Nonetheless, Tan persists on the president's check and balance role, and described the office as "a centre of moral power" rather than "a second centre of executive power."

Political pundits suggested that among Tan Jee Say, Tan Cheng Bock and Tan Kin Lian, two candidates should withdraw to facilitate a straight contest between one of them and Tony Tan, who was widely seen as the leading candidate. On 12 August, Tan Jee Say said he wouldn't back out of the contest.

Also on 12 August, Tony Tan said it would be a "grave mistake" to phase out manufacturing in Singapore. During nomination day, his supporters jeered at Tony Tan. Tan Jee Say later acknowledged that their actions were "not the correct way to conduct our campaign."

During a forum hosted by The Online Citizen attended by all four candidates on 19 August, Tan Jee Say got into a heated exchange with Tony Tan over the Internal Security Act (ISA), which allows the government to detain people without trial. Tan Jee Say said that the law has been used to detain political opponents of the government, which drew a pointed response from Tony Tan, who labelled it a "very serious charge" and asked the former to back it up. Tan Jee Say shot back: "The people who have been detained have opposed the government. That's what I'm saying," before he was interjected by the moderator.

=== Result ===
Tan garnered 25.04% of the vote, behind Tan Cheng Bock's 34.85% and Tony Tan's 35.20% of the vote. Reflecting on the result, Tan conceded that his "confrontational" image may have contributed to his defeat.

After losing the presidential election, Tan declined to join any political party, and announced that he would focus on forming a coalition of opposition parties to contest the next general election. His proposal was welcomed by the Singapore People's Party, National Solidarity Party, and Reform Party.
