= Progress Singapore Party =

Singaporean political party

- Malay name: Parti Kemajuan Singapura
- Chinese name: 新加坡前进党; Xīnjiāpō Qiánjìn Dǎng
- Tamil name: சிங்கப்பூர் முன்னேற்றக் கட்சி Ciṅkappūr Muṉṉēṟṟa Kaṭci
- Abbreviation: PSP
- Chairman: A’bas bin Kasmani
- Secretary-General: Leong Mun Wai
- Founder: Tan Cheng Bock
- Founded: 28 March 2019; 7 years ago
- Headquarters: 170 Upper Bukit Timah Road, #14-04, Bukit Timah Shopping Centre, Singapore 588179
- Youth wing: PSP Youth Catalyst
- Women's wing: Women Wing
- Ideology: Liberalism Progressivism
- Political position: Centre to Centre-left
- Colours: Red; White
- Slogan: For Country, For People
- Parliament: 0 / 104

Website
- psp.org.sg

The Progress Singapore Party (abbreviation: PSP) is a political party in Singapore. It was one of the three political parties represented in the 14th Parliament, alongside the governing People's Action Party (PAP) and the fellow opposition Workers' Party (WP); Leong Mun Wai and Hazel Poa represented it as non-constituency Members of Parliament (NCMPs).

The PSP was founded in 2019 by 11 people, including former PAP politician Tan Cheng Bock; Lee Hsien Yang, the estranged brother of then-Prime Minister Lee Hsien Loong, supported it. It held multiple talks and walkabouts throughout 2019, ahead of the 2020 general election, where it contested in nine constituencies. While it was defeated in all nine constituencies, the PSP became eligible for two NCMP seats, which Leong and Poa accepted. The two had been part of the PSP team for West Coast Group Representation Constituency (GRC), which garnered 48.32% of the vote.

In the 2025 general election, the PSP contested in six constituencies and faced a significant decline in support. It garnered 4.88% of the nationwide popular vote, and was not offered NCMP seats.

== History ==
=== Founding ===
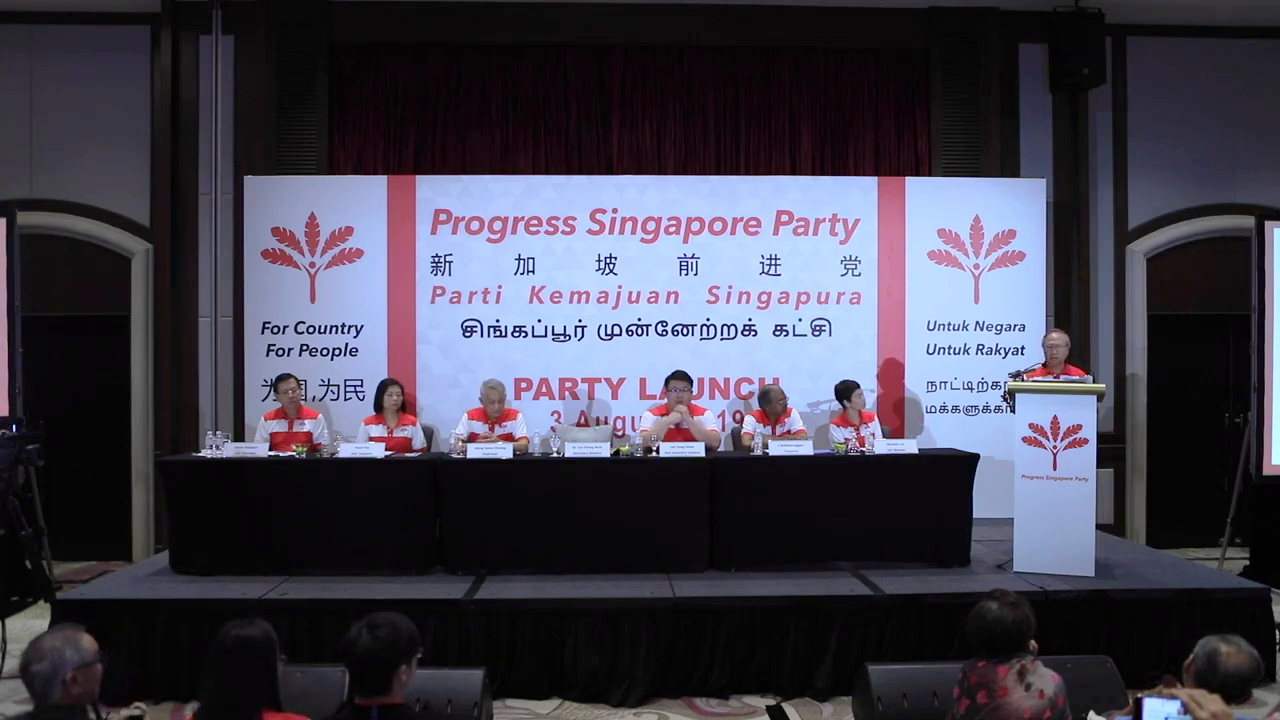
Tan Cheng Bock inaugurating the Progress Singapore Party, 2019

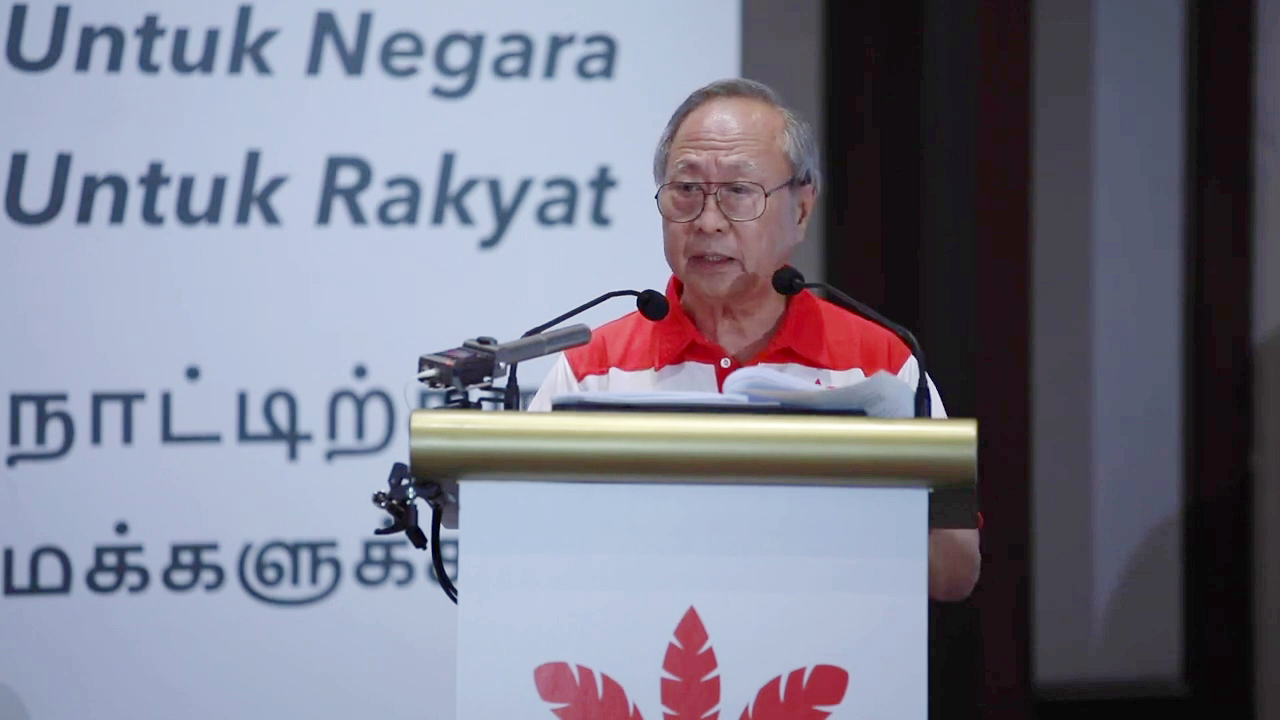
Tan Cheng Bock speaking, 2019

The PSP was founded in 2019 by Tan Cheng Bock and 11 other members. They, together with Lee Hsien Yang, the estranged brother of then-Prime Minister Lee Hsien Loong, expressed that the existing PAP leadership had "lost its way" and deviated from the party's founding principles.

The party was officially registered on 28 March 2019 with 12 members after being approved by the Registry of Societies. Tan said that the registration was the result of an erosion of governmental transparency, independence and accountability. Job creation was also cited as a main focus.

=== 2020 general election ===
On 29 September 2019, Tan led about 300 party members and volunteers during the PSP's first official island-wide walkabout. The walkabout, named "29 on 29", was conducted in 29 constituencies. In October 2019, the party called for volunteer polling and counting agents.

On 4 November, the PSP called for an opposition alliance meeting, privately attended by representatives from seven opposition political parties. According to Tan, the meeting was to discuss future plans and to introduce members of different parties to one another. On 9 November, the party began its second island-wide walkabout, involving about 220 members and volunteers.

On 17 January, a reshuffling of leadership was announced at the PSP's new year party. Two members of the central executive committee (CEC) exited, replaced by five new members. On 27 January, the PSP officially opened its new headquarters at Bukit Timah Shopping Centre.

On 10 July 2020, despite fielding the largest opposition slate with 24 candidates, the PSP did not win any constituencies; however, it came closest to winning West Coast GRC, whose PSP team was led by Tan himself and lost to the PAP team, led by S. Iswaran, with 48.31% of the vote. For having received the best result among defeated opposition candidates, the team was entitled to select two NCMPs. The party garnered 40.86% of the vote in contested constituencies, higher than the nationwide opposition vote share of 38.76%. It received 10.18% of the nationwide vote.

On 14 July, the PSP announced that Poa and Leong had accepted the NCMP seats.

=== 2020–2025: First Representation in Parliament of Singapore with NCMPs ===
After the elections, Poa and Leong stepped down as office bearers to focus on their NCMP duties. Both remained as CEC members and are involved in the party's activities. Francis Yuen took over as assistant general-secretary, while the vice-chairman post remained vacant.

Since then, PSP has formed its women's wing and youth wing to create more targeted policies helping these groups, headed by Tanjong Pagar GRC candidates Wendy Low and Terence Soon respectively. In addition, a Parliamentary Secretariat was formed to help the NCMPs with policy research for their duties, which is headed by both Leong and Poa. The women's wing was officially launched on 30 January 2021.

The PSP's CEC underwent a leadership renewal in March 2021; 11 CEC members stepped down and six new CEC members were elected. On 1 April, PSP announced that Yuen has taken over as the secretary-general of the party, with Tan being the chairperson. Wang Swee Chuang hence became the vice-chairperson. Later on 26 April, youth wing head Soon resigned citing career opportunities and family considerations, with newly elected member Jess Chua taking over three days later.

On 11 August 2021, party member Brad Bowyer resigned from the party after he made a post comparing differentiated measures for those vaccinated with the Holocaust, sparking controversy and condemnation including from the Israeli Embassy in Singapore. Bowyer has since stood by his views. On 25 October, treasurer and party member Kayla Low resigned from the Party citing frequent travelling requirements as part of her new career, although she would continue to volunteer with the Party. Party member Peggie Chua took over as the new treasurer. The following month, former party member Kala Manickam sued the party over claims of wrongful termination and seeks to have $10,000 reimbursed, to which the party leadership said there was no basis to the lawsuit, listing various events that led to her termination.

On 14 February 2022, Kumaran Pillai told party leaders he would step down from the positions of communications chief and party spokesman, taking a "leave of absence" for an unspecified period of time due to business ventures and health considerations, including a frozen shoulder sustained during a walkabout in the 2020 general election. Pillai will still be in the central executive committee, with Jonathan Tee taking over as the new communications chief, announced three days later.

On 4 April 2023, Leong succeeded Yuen as the new secretary-general after Yuen stepped down, with the party stating in a press release on 26 March that Yuen had "recently been appointed as executive chairman of an overseas publicly listed company, so his new position will make it difficult for him to lead the party". The PSP's Vice-Chairman Wang and Head of Youth Wing Chua also stepped down from the CEC, with Poa succeeding as the party's vice-Chairman.

The party came under spotlight during the last days of campaigning for the 2023 Singaporean presidential election after the party's founder Tan (along with Singapore Democratic Party and former presidential candidate Tan Jee Say) were reported to have given endorsements to a two-time candidate Tan Kin Lian in his presidential bid. The party responded that it was their discretion to support their candidates, and mentioned they will neither endorse or support any candidate who are non-partisan (a constitution rule where Presidency candidates are not allowed to be affiliated on any party at the time of election), and brought concerns citing that it may negatively impact the party. Prior to the election, Lee Hsien Yang also had expressed his intention to run for candidacy, but ultimately did not collect his application forms.

On 23 February 2024, Leong stepped down as secretary-general of PSP after the Singapore government issued a POFMA order which refuted the falsehoods made by Leong on his Facebook post. He remained on the party's governing body and as an NCMP.

=== 2025–present: Electoral setbacks ===
On 6 April 2025, PSP launched their manifesto. The party also announced its intention to contest in West Coast–Jurong West and Chua Chu Kang GRCs. They fielded fewer candidates in the 2025 general election compared to 2020. In the election that followed, the party fared worse across the board, securing only 36.25% of the votes it contested and 4.89% of the overall popular votes cast; the PAP's swings across the constituencies including West Coast–Jurong West GRC resulted in PSP not being awarded any NCMPs, ending their parliamentary presence. In their post-election interview, Leong described it as "shocking" but vowed to work hard "seriously and humbly" in the next election.

On 7 July 2026, CEC Member Stephanie Tan, who contested Pioneer SMC in the 2025 General Election, announced that she was leaving the party, due to "differences in opinion on PSP's direction". She obtained 34.55 per cent of the votes against PAP incumbent Patrick Tay. On the same day, the party also announced that lawyer Samuel Lim, the youngest member to be elected to the CEC at 29 years old in March 2025 and head of the party's youth wing, had also left the party.

== Organisation ==
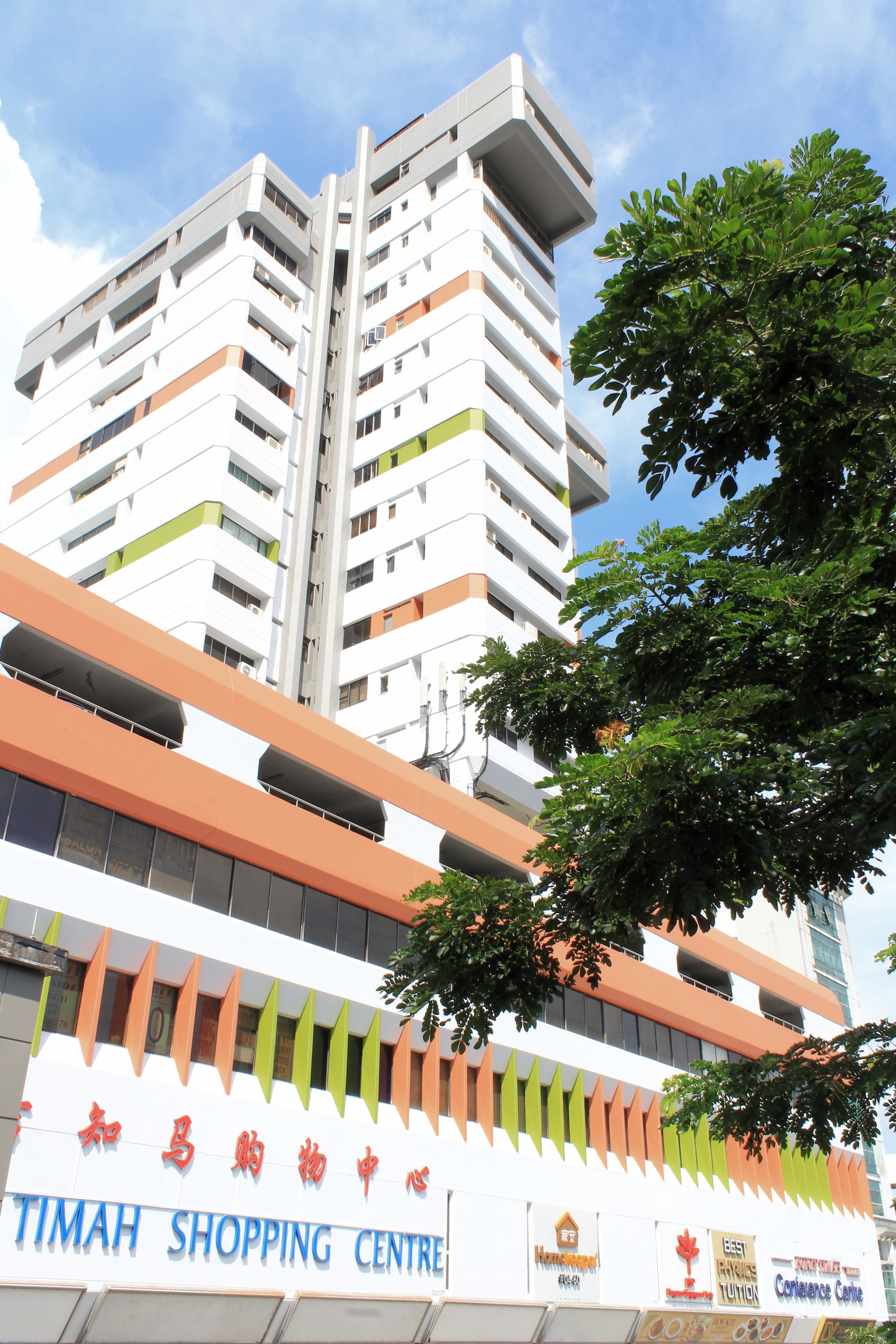
The Progress Singapore Party headquarters on the 14th floor of the Bukit Timah Shopping Centre

=== Central Executive Committee ===
| Office-holder | Name |
|---|---|
| Chairperson | A’bas Kasmani |
| Secretary-General | Leong Mun Wai |
| Treasurer | David Heng |
| Organising Secretary | Sani Ismail |
| Deputy Organising Secretary (Logistics) | Soh Zheng Long |
| Deputy Organising Secretary (Events) | Annapoorani Ravichandran |
| Head, Communications & Women's Wing | Wendy Low |
| Head, Internal Communications | Joseph Wong |
| Head, Membership | Dzulfadli Hassan |
| Head, Policy & Fundraising | Lawrence Pek |

=== List of secretaries-general ===
| No | Name | Took office | Left office | Tenure |
|---|---|---|---|---|
| 1 | Tan Cheng Bock | 28 March 2019 | 31 March 2021 | 2 years, 3 days |
| 2 | Francis Yuen | 1 April 2021 | 26 March 2023 | 1 year, 359 days |
| 3 | Leong Mun Wai | 4 April 2023 | 20 February 2024 | 322 days |
| 4 | Hazel Poa | 20 February 2024 | 20 March 2025 | 1 year, 28 days |
| 5 | Leong Mun Wai | 26 March 2025 | Incumbent | 1 year, 237 days |

=== List of chairpersons ===
| No | Name | Took office | Left office | Tenure |
|---|---|---|---|---|
| 1 | Wang Swee Chuang | 28 March 2019 | 31 March 2021 | 2 years, 3 days |
| 2 | Tan Cheng Bock | 1 April 2021 | 5 July 2025 | 5 years, 231 days |
| 3 | A’bas Kasmani | 5 July 2025 | Incumbent | 1 year, 136 days |

=== List of first vice-chairpersons ===
| No | Name | Took office | Left office | Tenure |
|---|---|---|---|---|
| 1 | Wang Swee Chuang | 1 April 2021 | 26 March 2023 | 1 year, 11 months, 26 days |
| 2 | Hazel Poa | 4 April 2023 | 20 February 2024 | 322 days |
| 3 | Hazel Poa | 26 March 2025 | 5 July 2025 | 1 year, 237 days |

=== List of second vice-chairpersons ===
| No | Name | Took office | Left office | Tenure |
|---|---|---|---|---|
| 1 | A’bas bin Kasmani | 26 March 2025 | 5 July 2025 | 1 year, 237 days |

=== List of former CEC members ===
| No | Name | Took office | Left office | Tenure |
|---|---|---|---|---|
| 1 | Michelle Lee Juen | 17 January 2020 | 5 March 2020 | 49 days |
| 2 | Abdul Rahman | 28 March 2019 | 28 March 2021 | 2 years |
| 3 | Alex Tan | 28 March 2019 | 28 March 2021 | 2 years |
| 4 | Andrew Ng | 28 March 2019 | 28 March 2021 | 2 years |
| 5 | Lee Chiu San | 28 March 2019 | 28 March 2021 | 2 years |
| 6 | Lee Yung Hwee | 28 March 2019 | 28 March 2021 | 2 years |
| 7 | Michael Chua Teck Leong | 28 March 2019 | 28 March 2021 | 2 years |
| 8 | Ong Seow Yeong | 4 August 2020 | 28 March 2021 | 236 days |
| 9 | Singam | 28 March 2019 | 28 March 2021 | 2 years |
| 10 | S Nallakaruppan | 28 March 2019 | 28 March 2021 | 2 years |
| 11 | Tan Chika | 17 January 2020 | 28 March 2021 | 436 days |
| 12 | Wong Chow Seng | 28 March 2019 | 28 March 2021 | 2 years |
| 13 | Kayla Low | 28 March 2021 | 25 October 2021 | 211 Days |
| 14 | Taufik Supan | 28 March 2021 | 23 June 2024 | 3 years |
| 15 | Kumaran Pillai | 1 April 2021 | 16 February 2022 | 322 Days |
| 16 | Ang Yong Guan | 4 April 2023 | 20 March 2025 | 2 Years |

== Members of Parliament ==
=== Current ===
The PSP has no current MPs, having lost its representation in Parliament in 2025.

=== Former ===
| Name | Constituency | Duration |
|---|---|---|
| Leong Mun Wai | NCMP | 2020 – 2025 |
| Hazel Poa | NCMP | 2020 – 2025 |

== Leadership ==
=== Secretary General ===
| No | Years | Name |
|---|---|---|
| 1 | 2019 – 2021 | Tan Cheng Bock |
| 2 | 2021 – 2023 | Francis Yuen |
| 3 | 2023 – 2024 | Leong Mun Wai |
| 4 | 2024 – 2025 | Hazel Poa |
| 5 | 2025 – present | Leong Mun Wai |

== Issues/proposals raised ==
=== Budget ===
In February 2020, PSP announced its first public policy proposal. The proposal called for a broader relief package for businesses, and expansionary budget to address the economic challenges posed by the ongoing crisis, and the development of a sustainable economy. It also opposed a planned Goods and Services (GST) increase, argued that taxpayers should not bear the costs of major infrastructure projects, and advocated a prudent approach to government expenditure. Notably, the party stated that fiscal budgets should not be treated as "goodie bags" for voters.

During the COVID-19 pandemic, the PSP supported the Government's relief plans that assisted Singaporeans and local companies. The party also advocated a broader approach to supporting the transport, retail, and food and beverage sectors, and called for a review of Singapore’s education system. It expressed support for long-term structural measures over short-term financial assistance and one-off handouts.

In the run-up to the 2025 General Election, the PSP proposed a package of social spending and tax reductions that it estimated would cost approximately S$7 billion to S$9 billion annually. The party argued that these measures could be financed without significantly worsening Singapore's fiscal position through changes to public housing land accounting and the introduction of levies on Employment Pass holders.

=== Climate change ===
On climate change, Tan Cheng Bock has suggested that government and government-linked companies should provide incentives for renewable energy usage.

=== Employment of foreign manpower ===
Tan Cheng Bock and the party has called for a review of the India–Singapore Comprehensive Economic Cooperation Agreement (CECA). It argued that the agreement’s provisions relating to the movement of professionals, one of the terms allowing the free movement of Indian professionals in 127 sectors to enter and work in Singapore, should be reassessed to ensure that employment opportunities for Singaporeans are prioritised. The party stated that concerns over CECA have been raised by some Singaporean professionals, managers, executives and technicians (PMETs) regarding job security and labour market competition. It also called on the government to publish an assessment of CECA’s impact, including information on its economic benefits to Singapore, the number of Indian professionals working in Singapore under the agreement, and the number of Singaporeans employed in India.

According to the PSP's manifesto published for the 2020 Singaporean General Election, the PSP wishes to introduce a quota for the number of Employment Passes and to lower the quota for the number of S-Passes and Work Permits. The manifesto also states that the dependence on foreign labour in Singapore has caused problems such as congestion, social strains and depressed wages. By curbing what the PSP describes as the easy supply of foreign manpower, they hope to encourage employers to invest in equipment or processes for higher productivity.

In 2025, the PSP continued to advocate on this front, suggesting a recalibration of Singapore's foreign manpower policies rather than a reduction in Singapore's openness to global talent. It proposed the introduction of a monthly Employment Pass levy of S$1,200, the refinement of Employment Pass quotas, and the publication of more detailed labour statistics broken down by citizenship status to better monitor underemployment among Singaporeans. The party argued that such measures would strengthen the Singaporean core while preserving access to foreign expertise where necessary.

=== Protection from Online Falsehoods and Manipulation Act (POFMA) ===
PSP issued a statement on POFMA, stating that the POFMA does not measure up to standards of transparency and accountability. The party views that POFMA should be the prerogative of the Courts of Singapore. The PSP's manifesto released for the 2020 Singaporean General Election states that POFMA should be reviewed.

This call was reiterated in the 2025 manifesto, when they argued that aspects of the law should be reassessed to strengthen checks and balances and to address concerns regarding executive discretion.

=== Central Provident Fund ===
The PSP proposed that Medishield Life premiums should be paid for by the Government. They are currently paid for using Medisave.

=== Small and medium enterprises ===
The PSP proposed measures to support local small and medium-sized enterprises (SMEs), including giving them greater priority in public sector procurement, facilitating investment in local SMEs, encouraging collaboration among businesses, providing support for business restructuring and overseas expansion, and reducing operating costs.

=== Taxes ===
In their manifesto for the 2020 Singapore General Election, the PSP stated that they wanted to freeze tax and fee increases until 2025.

In 2025, to address concerns over the rising cost of living, the PSP proposed reducing the Goods and Services Tax (GST) from 9 per cent to 7 per cent. It also proposed exempting basic essential goods from GST. The party argued that these measures would provide immediate relief to households, particularly lower-income families.

=== Racial harmony ===
In response to a video by entertainers Preeti and Subjas Nair which spoke out about the use of racial brownface in an advertisement, then-Central Executive Committee member Michelle Lee stated that although the siblings had used inappropriate language in their video, she found the police response in the aftermath to be 'high-handed' and 'harsh'. Lee acknowledged the video by the siblings reflected grievances that the minority races held in Singapore, and should not be ignored.

The unity of Singaporeans regardless of race, language or religion was one of the principles which the PSP said guided their social policies in their 2020 manifesto.

=== Voting age ===
During the party launch ceremony, Michelle Lee called for the lowering of voting age from the current 21 to 18 in line with international standards. In her speech, she criticised the current government policy on voting age as being 'behind the times'.

=== Alternative voices in Parliament ===
The PSP's 2020 manifesto states that the over-dominance of the People's Action Party, which has consistently held over 90% of the seats in the Parliament of Singapore, should be reduced. They want stronger alternative voices in Parliament offering different views and suggestions. More alternative voices in Parliament is one of the PSP's priorities in political development stated in the manifesto.

=== Public housing ===
One of the PSP's priorities laid out in their 2020 manifesto was to address HDB lease decay. They hope to provide en-bloc redevelopment for all old HDB flats, peg new flat prices to income levels and bring down housing costs for young Singaporeans.

In 2025, the PSP proposed extensive reforms to Singapore's public housing system aimed at improving affordability and accessibility. It advocated allowing Singaporeans aged 28 and above to purchase two-room and three-room Build-To-Order (BTO) flats regardless of marital status. It also introduced its Affordable Homes Scheme, under which the upfront land costs of BTO flats would be removed from purchase prices and recovered only upon resale.

The party argued that these measures would better reflect changing social norms and reduce barriers to home ownership, particularly for singles.

=== Income inequality ===
The PSP's 2020 manifesto states that they hope to reduce inequality and improve social mobility. It also states that they wish to exempt basic necessities from the Goods and Services Tax.

This was another key pillar that the party campaigned on in the 2025 election, where the PSP identified income inequality and rising living costs as central challenges facing Singapore. To address these issues, it proposed the introduction of a minimum living wage of S$2,250 per month for resident Singaporean workers, alongside broader measures including GST reductions, healthcare support, and expanded social assistance. The party framed these policies as part of a broader effort to build a fairer society and ensure that Singaporeans could live with dignity.

=== Other issues ===
In 2019, Michelle Lee commented on the high ministerial salary "keep ministers in their ivory towers" which causes them to become afraid of taking risks or disagreeing with the establishment. She added that the highest-paid minister earns approximately 43 times the average Singaporean and an entry-level minister earns half of that. The PSP's 2020 manifesto states that ministerial salaries should be cut and pegged to the median income.

Lee also pointed out that more Singaporean students are discouraged from tertiary education, while the government spends $130 million on foreign students' scholarships.

== Electoral performance ==
=== Parliament ===
| Election | Leader | Votes | % | Seats | | | | | NCMPs | Position | Result |
| Election | Leader | Votes | % | Contested | | | Total | +/– | NCMPs | Position | Result |
| Election | Leader | Votes | % | Seats | Won | Lost | Total | +/– | NCMPs | Position | Result |
|---|---|---|---|---|---|---|---|---|---|---|---|
| 2020 | Tan Cheng Bock | 253,996 | 10.18% | 24 | 0 | 24 | 0 / 93 | Steady | 2 / 2 | ▲3rd | No seats (with NCMPs) |
| 2025 | Leong Mun Wai | 116,607 | 4.89% | 13 | 0 | 13 | 0 / 97 | Steady | 0 / 2 | 3rd | No seats |

==== Seats contested ====
| Election | Constituencies contested | Contested vote % | +/– |
|---|---|---|---|
| 2020 | 5-member GRC: Nee Soon, Tanjong Pagar, West Coast; 4-member GRC: Chua Chu Kang; SMC: Hong Kah North, Kebun Baru, Marymount, Pioneer, Yio Chu Kang | 40.86% | —N/a |
| 2025 | 5-member GRC: West Coast-Jurong West; 4-member GRC: Chua Chu Kang; SMC: Bukit Gombak, Kebun Baru, Marymount, Pioneer | 36.25% | ▼4.61% |

== See also ==
- Elections in Singapore
- Politics of Singapore
