= Ang Yong Guan =

Singaporean politician

Ang Yong Guan PBM
- 洪永元
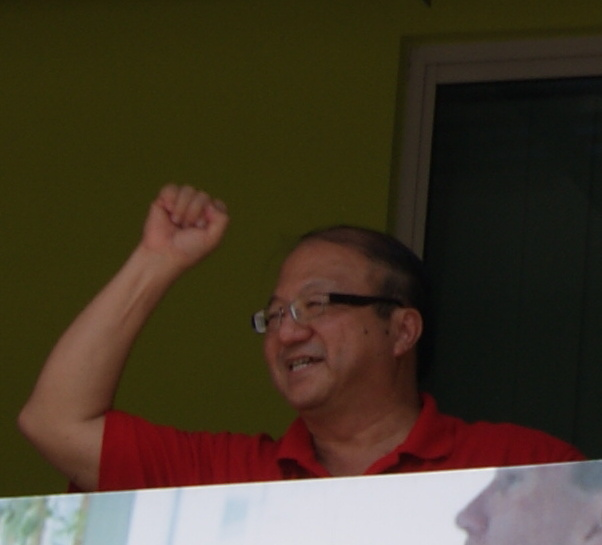
- Ang in 2011

Assistant Secretary-General of the Progress Singapore Party
- In office 4 April 2023 – 20 March 2025
- Chairman: Tan Cheng Bock
- Secretary-General: Leong Mun Wai
- Preceded by: Francis Yuen

Head of Training and Development of the Progress Singapore Party
- In office 10 July 2020 – 4 April 2023
- Chairman: Tan Cheng Bock
- Secretary-General: Francis Yuen
- Preceded by: Position established
- Succeeded by: Position abolished

Chairman of the Singaporeans First
- In office 2014–2019
- Secretary-General: Tan Jee Say
- Preceded by: Position established
- Succeeded by: Position abolished

Personal details
- Born: 24 January 1955 (age 71) Colony of Singapore
- Party: Progress Singapore Party
- Other political affiliations: Singaporeans First (2014–2019); Singapore Democratic Party (2010–2011)
- Children: 4
- Education: National University of Singapore; University of Edinburgh
- Occupation: Politician; psychiatrist

Military service
- Branch/service: Singapore Armed Forces
- Years of service: 1980–2003
- Rank: Colonel

Ang Yong Guan PBM (Chinese: 洪永元; pinyin: Hóng Yǒngyuán; born 24 January 1955) is a Singaporean politician, psychiatrist and former Singapore Armed Forces colonel. As a member of the opposition Progress Singapore Party (PSP), he served as the Head of Training and Development between 2020 and 2023 and has been the PSP's Second Assistant Secretary-General between 2023 and 2025.

== Early life ==
Ang graduated from the National University of Singapore in 1979 and had his postgraduate training in psychiatry at the University of Edinburgh between 1984 and 1986.

== Career ==
=== Military career ===
Ang had served in the Singapore Armed Forces for 23 years, and was Chief Psychiatrist of the Psychological Medicine Branch before he retired from the SAF in 2003. He attained the highest rank of Colonel.

=== Political career ===
In 2011 general election, Ang joined the Singapore Democratic Party. Along with team members, Tan Jee Say, Vincent Wijeysingha and Michelle Leea contested in a four-member Holland–Bukit Timah Group Representation Constituency (GRC) and obtained 39.92% of valid votes.

In 2014, Ang was appointed as chairman of SingFirst. In the 2015 general election, Ang joined SingFirst along with team members, Tan Jee Say, Melvyn Chiu, Chirag Praful Desail and Mohamad Fahmi Bin Ahmad Rais contested in a five-member Tanjong Pagar GRC and obtained with 22.29% of valid votes.

On 25 June 2020, Tan dissolved SingFirst. Ang joined as a candidate of the PSP in the 2020 Singaporean general election and stood in the newly created Marymount Single Member Constituency (SMC) but was defeated with 44.96% of valid votes.

After the 2020 general election, Ang was appointed as Head of Training and Development of the PSP between 2020 and 2023. On 4 April 2023, Ang was appointed as second Assistant Secretary-General of the PSP.

=== Medical career ===
Ang ran a private clinic at the Paragon Shopping Mall. On 5 February 2025, Ang was handed down a three-year suspension by the Supreme Court for professional misconduct in overprescribing medication to a patient who later died, and closed his clinic on 17 February 2025.

== Personal life ==
Ang is married to an educator and together they have four children.

== Awards ==
In 1995, Ang was awarded the Public Service Medal for his grassroots contributions as a community leader at Kembangan Constituency, helping then-Member of Parliament George Yeo for more than 15 years. He was also awarded the Public Administration Medal in 1996 for his military services.
