= Jacqueline Cramer =

Dutch politician and biologist

Her Excellency Jacqueline Cramer
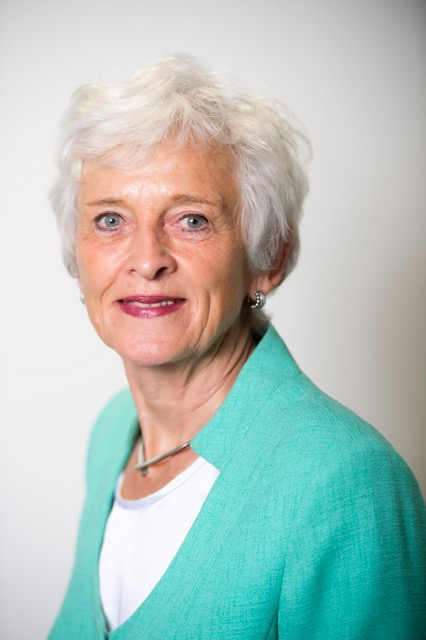
- Cramer in 2018

Minister of Housing, Spatial Planning and the Environment
- In office 22 February 2007 – 23 February 2010
- Prime Minister: Jan Peter Balkenende
- Preceded by: Pieter Winsemius
- Succeeded by: Tineke Huizinga

Member of the Social and Economic Council
- In office 1 January 1999 – 22 February 2007
- Chairman: Herman Wijffels

Personal details
- Born: Jacqueline Marian Cramer; 10 April 1951 (age 75) Amsterdam, Netherlands
- Party: Labour Party
- Children: 1 son and 1 daughter
- Education: University of Arkansas; Bachelor of Science; University of Amsterdam (Master of Science, Doctor of Philosophy)
- Occupation: Politician · Civil servant · Biologist · Researcher · Management consultant · Corporate director · Nonprofit director · Activist · Academic administrator · Author · Professor

Jacqueline Marian Cramer (born 10 April 1951) is a retired Dutch politician of the Labour Party (PvdA) and biologist.

Cramer was Minister of Housing, Spatial Planning and the Environment in the Fourth Balkenende cabinet for the PvdA. Previously she was a professor of sustainable entrepreneurship at Utrecht University and professor of environmental management at Erasmus University. She is member of the board of directors at Royal Dutch Shell and a member of the Social-Economic Council. Eisenhower Fellowships selected Jacqueline Cramer in 1992 to represent The Netherlands.

Cramer studied biology in Arkansas and at the University of Amsterdam. In 1987 she obtained her Ph.D. with Mission-orientation in Ecology. The Case of Dutch Fresh-water Ecology, with honours. She has two children and lives in Amsterdam.

== Decorations ==
Honours
Ribbon bar	Honour	Country	Date	Comment
	Officer of the Order of Orange-Nassau	Netherlands	3 December 2010	

Political offices
Preceded by Pieter Winsemius	Minister of Housing, Spatial; Planning and the Environment; 2007–2010	Succeeded by Tineke Huizinga
Non-profit organization positions
Unknown	Chairwoman of Milieudefensie; 1985–1987	Unknown
