= Tineke Huizinga =

Dutch politician (born 1960)

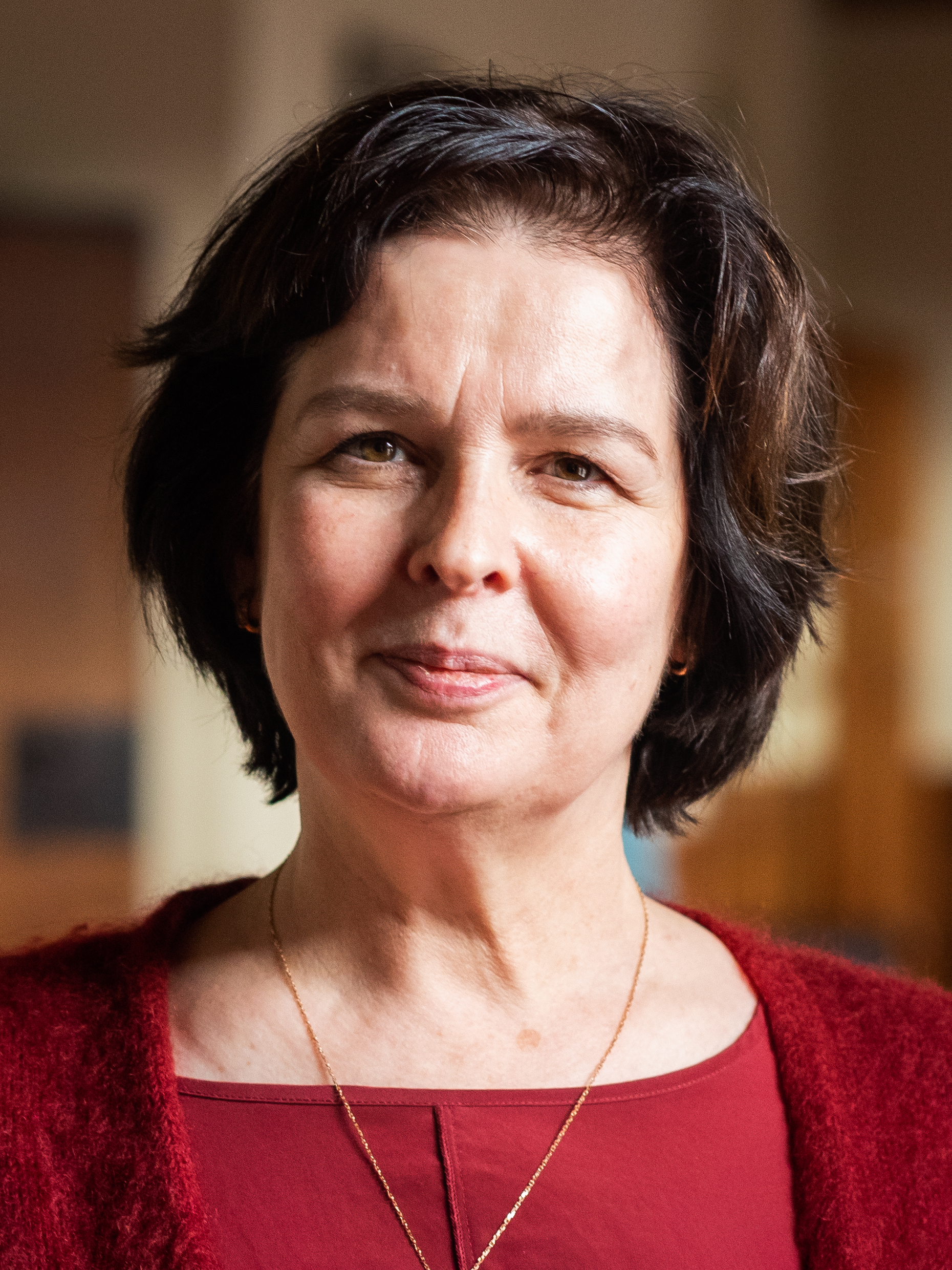
- Huizinga in 2019

Minister of Housing, Spatial Planning and the Environment
- In office 23 February 2010 – 14 October 2010
- Prime Minister: Jan Peter Balkenende
- Preceded by: Jacqueline Cramer
- Succeeded by: Melanie Schultz van Haegen as Minister of Infrastructure and the Environment

State Secretary for Transport and Water Management
- In office 22 February 2007 – 23 February 2010
- Prime Minister: Jan Peter Balkenende
- Preceded by: Melanie Schultz van Haegen
- Succeeded by: Joop Atsma as State Secretary for Infrastructure and the Environment

Member of the House of Representatives
- In office 23 May 2002 – 22 February 2007

Personal details
- Born: Johanna Catharina Heringa; 16 February 1960 (age 66) Dantumadiel, Netherlands
- Party: Christian Union (from 2002)
- Other political affiliations: Reformatory Political Federation (until 2002)
- Spouse: Ruurd Huizinga (m. 1982)
- Children: 3 children
- Education: Utrecht University (Bachelor of Laws)
- Occupation: Politician · Corporate director · Nonprofit director · Refugee worker

Johanna Catharina "Tineke" Huizinga-Heringa (born 16 February 1960) is a Dutch politician of the Christian Union (CU).

Huizinga grew up in Amersfoort; both of her parents were teachers. After attending gymnasium, she began to study law at the University of Utrecht. She became involved in the Christian student's association Ichtus, where she met her future husband. They married in 1982. After passing her candidate exams (roughly equivalent of a bachelor's degree), she stopped her studies and moved to Heerenveen. She became a housewife and mother of three children.

She volunteered as translator at a Christian foundation, Open Doors, which advocates the interest of persecuted Christians worldwide. She became involved in the cases of asylum seekers and refugees and worked as a volunteer for VluchtenlingenWerk Nederland. Because of her involvement with social and religious issues, the Reformatory Political Federation asked her to become their lead candidate in Heerenveen for the 1998 municipal elections. She was elected into the Heerenveen municipal council.

In 2002 she was elected member of House of Representatives. She was elected on basis of preference votes. The ChristianUnion only got four seats and she was seventh candidate, but because so many voters voted for her she entered parliament at the cost of prominent GPV leader Eimert van Middelkoop. She was member of the parliamentary research committee into the Srebrenica massacre. In the 2003 elections she was re-elected, again with preference votes, now at the cost of Leen van Dijke. She was fourth candidate and the ChristianUnion only got three seats. In parliament she had been occupied with foreign affairs, international development, migration, integration, spatial planning and the environment. She was secretary of the parliamentary party.

On 22 February 2007, she became State Secretary for Transport and Public Works in the fourth Balkenende cabinet. The later MP Pieter Grinwis became Huizinga's political assistant. Her portfolio included all subjects related to water: primary water defenses, dikes, coastal protection, Room for the River, waterways, inland navigation, maritime shipping, regional seaports and KNMI. In addition, Huizinga was responsible for market forces in public transport, social safety and cab policy.

As Secretary of State for Transport, Public Works and Water Management, Huizinga survived a motion of no confidence in April 2008 over the (supposedly failed) introduction of a MIFARE-based nationwide public transport payment system.

== Decorations ==
Honours
Ribbon bar	Honour	Country	Date	Comment
	Officer of the Order of Orange-Nassau	Netherlands	3 December 2010	

Political offices
Preceded by Melanie Schultz van Haegen	State Secretary for Transport and Water Management; 2007–2010	Succeeded by Joop Atsma as State Secretary for Infrastructure and the Environment
Preceded by Jacqueline Cramer	Minister of Housing, Spatial; Planning and the Environment; 2010	Succeeded by Melanie Schultz van Haegen as Minister of Infrastructure and the Environment
Non-profit organization positions
Unknown	Chairwoman of the Wilde Ganzen Foundation; 2015–present	Incumbent
