= Joop Atsma =

Dutch politician (born 1956)

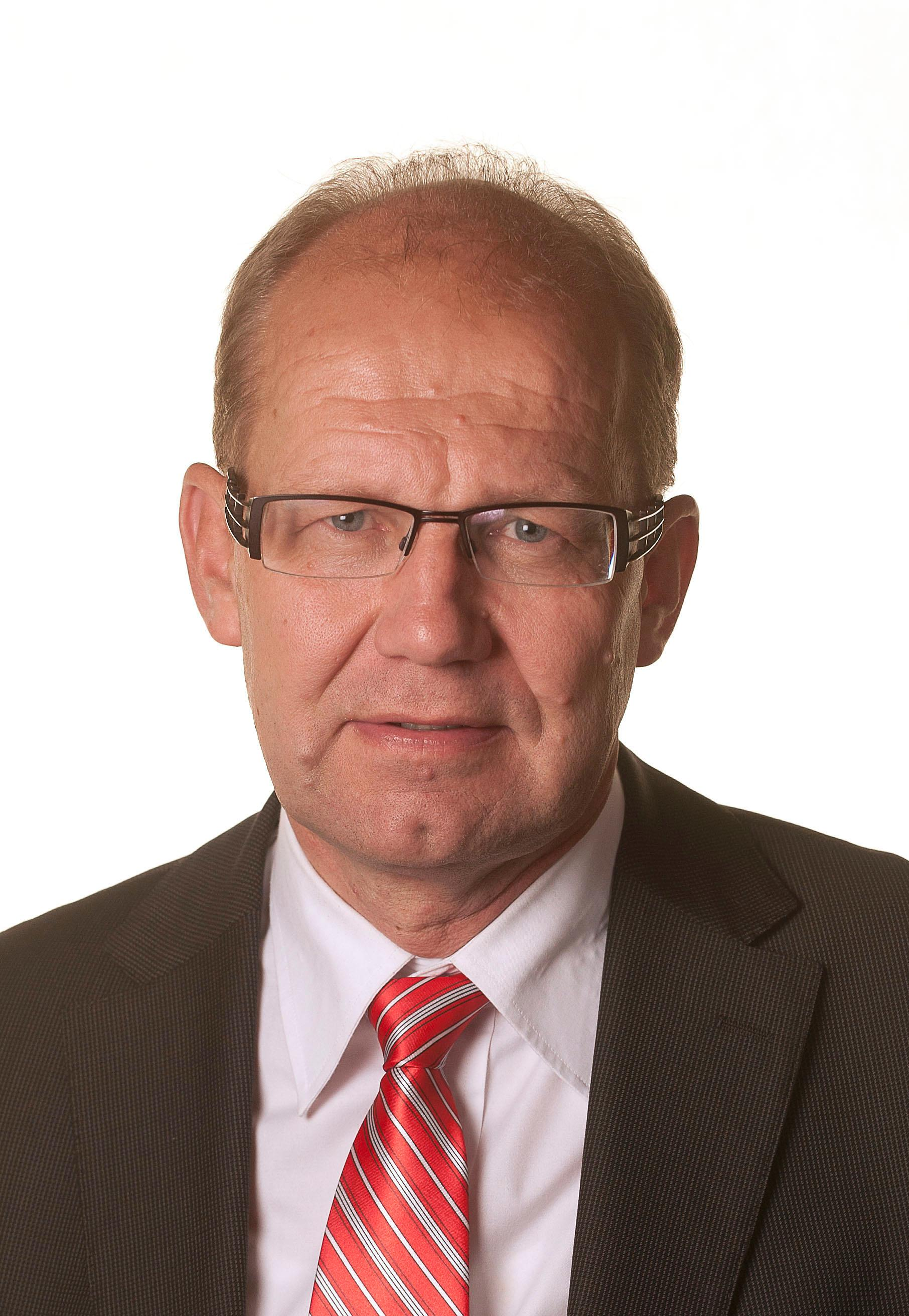
- Joop Atsma in 2010

Member of the Senate
- In office 9 June 2015 – 12 June 2023

State Secretary for Infrastructure and the Environment
- In office 14 October 2010 – 5 November 2012
- Prime Minister: Mark Rutte
- Preceded by: Tineke Huizinga as State Secretary for Transport and Water Management
- Succeeded by: Wilma Mansveld

Member of the House of Representatives
- In office 19 May 1998 – 14 October 2010

Personal details
- Born: Johannes Jan Atsma; 6 July 1956 (age 70) Surhuisterveen, Netherlands
- Party: Christian Democratic Appeal (from 1980)
- Other political affiliations: Anti-Revolutionary Party (until 1980)
- Spouse: Tea van der Schaaf (m. 1982)
- Children: 1 son and 1 daughter
- Education: University of Groningen (Bachelor of Arts)
- Occupation: Politician · Journalist · Editor · Columnist · Author · Sport administrator

Johannes Jan "Joop" Atsma (born 6 July 1956) is a Dutch politician of the Christian Democratic Appeal (CDA) party and sport administrator. He was a member of the Senate since between 9 June 2015 and 12 June 2023.

== Biography ==
Joop Atsma is the son of dairy farmer Pieter Atsma and Tjitske van der Meer. After secondary school, he began to study history at the University of Groningen, but he did not complete his studies.

In 1978 he began his career as a journalist; he worked for the Nederlandse Omroep Stichting (NOS), Friesch Dagblad, Nieuwsblad van het Noorden and Omrop Fryslân.

From 1989, he worked at the KNWU Straatsma, first as an amateur cycling section president and later as chairman. In the Olympic Games in Seoul (1988), Barcelona (1992), Atlanta (1996) and Sydney (2000) Atsma was chef d'equipe of cycling. In 2009, Joop Atsma was appointed chairman of the Road Committee of the International cycling body UCI. This committee is responsible for such regulation of wegsport, admitting teams, fixture lists and qualification criteria for World Championships and Olympic Games. Atsma 178ste during the meeting of the International Cycling Union in Lugano in 2009 again elected to the Board of the Union Cycliste Internationale. From 1994 to 2006 he was chairman of the Royal Dutch Cycling Union.

Atsma began his political career as a member of the Provincial Council of Friesland. In 1998, Atsma was elected to the House. He took his oath in the West Frisian language. In parliament he was involved with sports, agriculture, food, media and mining. He was also chairman of the Standing Committee for Agriculture, Nature and Food Quality and vice chair of the standing committee on Health, Welfare and Sports. On 14 October 2010 Atsma was appointed State Secretary for Infrastructure and Environment in the first Rutte cabinet. Because of this appointment Atsma at that date resigned from all paid and unpaid (side) functions and took distance from relevant business and financial interests.

== Decorations ==
Honours
Ribbon bar	Honour	Country	Date	Comment
	Knight of the Order of Orange-Nassau	Netherlands	7 December 2012	

== Electoral history ==
Electoral history of Joop Atsma
Year	Body	Party	Pos.	Votes	Result		Ref.
Year	Body	Party	Pos.	Votes	Party seats	Individual	Ref.
2021	House of Representatives	Christian Democratic Appeal	69 (Note: Participated as lijstduwer in the electoral district Leeuwarden.)	137	15	Lost	

== Notes ==
Political offices
Preceded by Tineke Huizinga as State Secretary for Transport and Water Management	State Secretary for Infrastructure and the Environment; 2010–2012	Succeeded by Wilma Mansveld
