= Pieter Grinwis =

Dutch politician (born 1979)

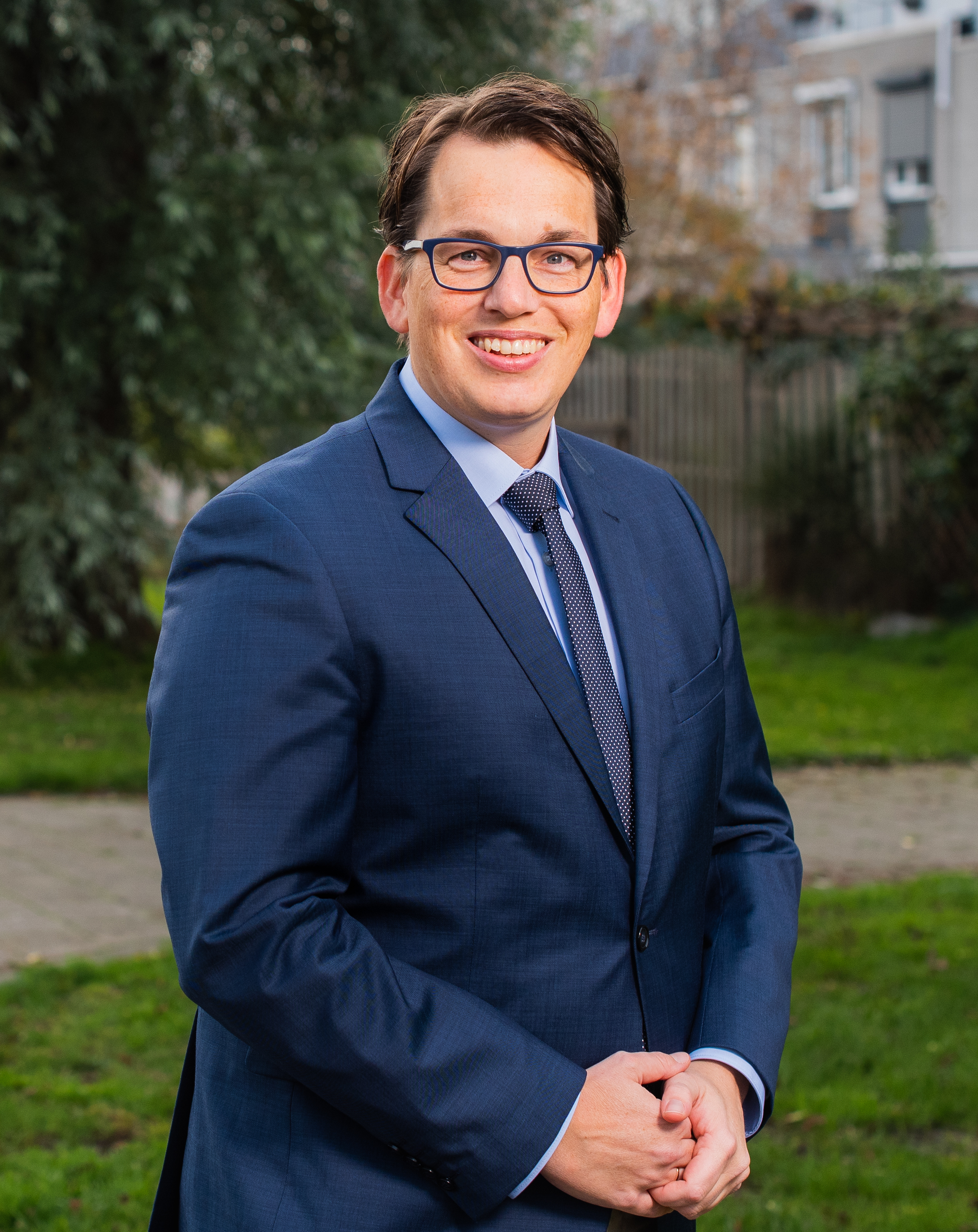

Member of the House of Representatives
- Incumbent
- Assumed office 31 March 2021

Member of The Hague municipal council
- In office 27 March 2014 – 15 April 2021
- Succeeded by: Judith Klokkenburg

Personal details
- Born: Pieter Aren Grinwis; 12 October 1979 (age 46) Ouddorp, Netherlands
- Party: Christian Union
- Children: 4
- Education: Wageningen UR (not finished); Leiden University

Pieter Aren Grinwis (born 12 October 1979) is a Dutch politician, who has been serving as a member of the House of Representatives on behalf of the Christian Union since March 2021. He previously served as a municipal councilor in The Hague and assisted the party in the House of Representatives and the Senate.

== Early life and education ==
Grinwis was born in 1979 in Ouddorp in South Holland as the son of an arable farmer. He grew up in that village with his two younger brothers and attended the Middelharnis secondary school CSG Prins Maurits at vwo level. Grinwis subsequently studied economics of agriculture and environment at Wageningen University and Research, but he did not finish his program due to an illness and a scooter accident. He was a member of the Reformed Political Party (SGP) and of the Christian student organization C.S.F.R. He has told that he ended up at the Christian Union due to senator and philosopher Egbert Schuurman, one of his professors in university.

Grinwis received a degree in public administration from Leiden University in 2020.

== Career ==
Starting in October 2002, he interned at the Christian Union's scientific institute and its European Parliament caucus. He replaced a staff worker, who was on parental leave, the following year and got a permanent position as policy officer of the House caucus in 2004. He served as the political assistant to state secretary and minister Tineke Huizinga starting in 2007. Besides, he was on Christian Union's 2006 election program committee, and he would later also help write the programs for the general elections in 2010, 2012, 2017, and 2021. In 2010, he became a political and financial–economic advisor of Wim Kuijken, the commissioner of the Delta Programme, which aims to prevent flooding. Grinwis had been involved in the creation of the governmental cooperation as Huizinga's assistant and continued working there until 2015.

=== Municipal councilor (2014–2021) ===
Grinwis was the lijsttrekker of the shared list of the Christian Union and the SGP during the 2014 municipal election in The Hague. Both parties had a history of cooperating in The Hague municipal politics with the exception of the previous election, when neither party won any seats in the council. During the campaign, Grinwis advocated curbing prostitution in the city by introducing a ban on procuring. He was elected and was installed on 27 March. While in the municipal council, Grinwis also worked as a financial advisor for the Christian Union caucus in the House of Representatives and the Senate. Grinwis introduced over 65 motions and amendments that passed during his first term, more than any other councilor in The Hague in the same years. In the 2017 election, he ran for MP, appearing on the 14th place of the Christian Union's party list. His party won five seats, while Grinwis received 269 preferential votes – not enough to be elected. He served as a negotiator of the Christian Union concerned with financial policy during the government formation. In that position, he found a way to prevent health insurance deductibles from having to increase despite European regulations by raising premiums.

He was re-elected as municipal councilor in 2018, again being the lijsttrekker of the Christian Union and the SGP. He favored leaving the Rotterdam–The Hague metropolitan area partnership, calling it undemocratic. The council banned the sale of laughing gas on the streets in 2020, a year after Grinwis had first proposed it.

=== Election to the House of Representatives ===
In the 2021 general election, Grinwis appeared on the Christian Union's party list as the fifth candidate. He designed a new tax system for the campaign, calling the current one "hopelessly unjust, complex, and individualistic". He said that the current system was focused too much on stimulating people to do paid work. To make the system less complicated, he proposed abolishing allowances (toeslagen), exemptions, and most deductions, and – to compensate for this – he proposed instituting a single tax deduction for households, lowering income tax, and raising the minimum wage, the state pension, and the municipal welfare (bijstand) by 10%. Furthermore, under the plan, corporate taxes would be increased.

Grinwis was sworn into the House on 31 March after having been elected with 1,240 preference votes. He served as his party's spokesperson for agriculture, nature, food quality, finances, climate, energy, water management, housing, spatial planning, economic affairs, and infrastructure. Grinwis vacated his seat in The Hague municipal council on 15 April.

=== House term and re-election ===
He was involved in the creation of a €514 million national insulation program to make buildings more sustainable. In anticipation to the program, Grinwis presented together with the CDA and GroenLinks a twelve-point manifesto, which included making subsidies attractive to lower-income households and which had to be considered in the drafting of the actual program according to a passed motion. In the House, Grinwis also proposed for policy officers of the Ministry of Agriculture, Nature and Food Quality to be encouraged to intern at farms, nature organizations, and the NVWA, and he unsuccessfully called for a halt to the construction of new data centers due to their footprint and energy usage, when one in Zeewolde for Facebook was nearing approval. He brought forward a compromise in May 2022 when D66 and GroenLinks wanted to abolish unelected members of water councils through an initiative bill. Grinwis's amendment was carried to remove the unelected member of daily management and to fix the unelected water council members to two representing farmers and two representing nature organizations, thereby getting rid of company representatives. The bill subsequently passed the House. In October 2022, Grinwis proposed a new tax on online shopping deliveries due to their greenhouse gas emissions and the nuisance caused by delivery vans. The money raised would be invested in small and medium-sized enterprises.

Furthermore, Grinwis submitted an initiative bill with Henk Nijboer (Labour Party) to prohibit temporary rental contracts for houses in most cases. They had been allowed since 2016 to increase the stock of rental homes and accounted for one third of new contracts, but Grinwis argued that they had been ineffective and had caused uncertainty among renters. He decried an amendment proposed by the VVD and the CDA to include an exception for landlords with one unit who want to sell their property. A majority of the House favored the bill without the amendment after the CDA had dropped its support, and it was adopted by the Senate in November 2023. Grinwis was re-elected in November 2023, and his specialties within the Christian Union's parliamentary group remained the same.

The National Political Index – an initiative to quantify the activities of members of parliament – concluded that Grinwis was the most active House member of both the 2022/23 and 2023/24 political years. He had ranked second the year before. As a result, the verb 'grinwissen' has been used in parliamentary language to refer to working hard, but speakers are flexible on what aspect of parliamentary work the term is applied.

== Personal life ==
Grinwis lives in The Hague, and he has a wife called Suzanne and four children.

== Electoral history ==
Electoral history of Pieter Grinwis
Year	Body	Party	Pos.	Votes	Result		Ref.
Year	Body	Party	Pos.	Votes	Party seats	Individual	Ref.
2017	House of Representatives	Christian Union	14	269	5	Lost	
2021	House of Representatives	Christian Union	5	1,240	5	Won	
2023	House of Representatives	Christian Union	2	4,449	3	Won	
2025	House of Representatives	Christian Union	2	4,187	3	Won	
2026	The Hague Municipal Council	Christian Union – Reformed Political Party	41 (Note: Grinwis participated as lijstduwer.)	26	1	Lost	
