= Francis Yuen =

Singaporean politician

- 阮健平

2nd Secretary-General of the Progress Singapore Party
- In office 1 April 2021 – 26 March 2023
- Chairman: Tan Cheng Bock (since 2021)
- Preceded by: Tan Cheng Bock
- Succeeded by: Leong Mun Wai

2nd Assistant Secretary-General of the Progress Singapore Party
- In office 2019–2021
- Preceded by: Leong Mun Wai
- Succeeded by: Nadrarajah Loganathan; Ang Yong Guan

Personal details
- Born: 1950 (age 75–76) Colony of Singapore
- Children: 2
- Education: National University of Singapore; Air Command and Staff College

Military service
- Branch/service: Republic of Singapore Air Force
- Rank: Lieutenant-Colonel
- Unit: 120 Squadron

Francis Yuen Kin Pheng (Chinese: 阮健平; Jyutping: Jyun^{5} Gin^{6} Ping^{4}) is a Singaporean politician who served as Progress Singapore Party (PSP) assistant secretary-general from 2019 to 2021 and as secretary-general from 2021 to 2023.

Yuen had indicated that he would lead the PSP into the 2025 general election prior to leaving office.

== Early life ==
Yuen is the oldest of eight siblings in his family and was raised in Chinatown, Singapore. Both his parents died within a year of each other during his O Level examination. Yuen signed on with the Republic of Singapore Air Force (RSAF) after his A Level.

== Career ==
=== Military career ===
As part of his training to be a helicopter pilot, Yuen was part of the first batch of pilots to be sent to France for aviation training. As part of 120 Squadron, he assembled the first RSAF helicopter, and also flew on his first operational flight on the Cessna 172. Failing to graduate from flight training, Yuen was selected as a scholar and pursued a bachelor's degree in business administration at the National University of Singapore, where he also attained his master's degree. He topped his classes and won several academic awards.

Yuen was then deployed to the United States Air Command and Staff College before returning to the RSAF at the Air Force Systems Command for various leadership roles.

=== Political career ===
In the 2020 general election, Yuen joined the Progress Singapore Party and contested as part of a four member team in Chua Chu Kang GRC but lost to the ruling People's Action Party.

After the 2020 general election, Yuen was appointed as the PSP's Assistant Secretary-General from 2019 to 2021. Yuen was appointed Secretary-General of Progress Singapore Party from 2021 to 2023. Yuen had indicated that he would lead party into the next general election when he was the Secretary-General. This did not happen as he stepped down as secretary-general before the next election.
