= Pieter Winsemius =

Dutch politician and businessman

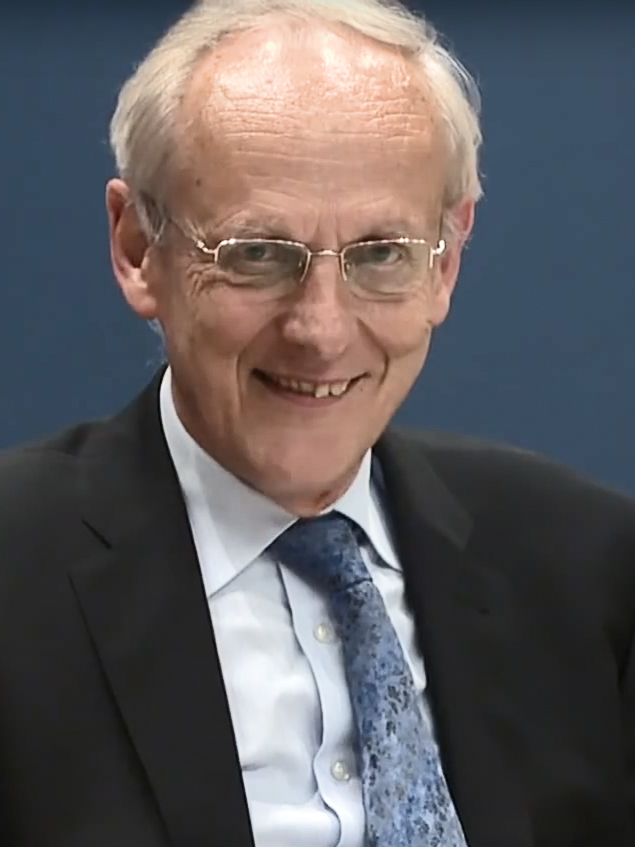
- Winsemius in 2014

Member of the Scientific Council for Government Policy
- In office 22 February 2007 – 21 November 2012
- Director: See list: Wim van de Donk (2007–2009) André Knottnerus (2010–2012)
- In office 1 January 2003 – 26 September 2006
- Director: See list: Michiel Scheltema (2003–2004) Wim van de Donk (2004–2006)

Minister of Housing, Spatial Planning and the Environment
- In office 26 September 2006 – 22 February 2007
- Prime Minister: Jan Peter Balkenende
- Preceded by: Karla Peijs (Ad interim)
- Succeeded by: Jacqueline Cramer
- In office 4 November 1982 – 14 July 1986
- Prime Minister: Ruud Lubbers
- Preceded by: Erwin Nypels as Minister of Housing and Spatial Planning
- Succeeded by: Ed Nijpels

Personal details
- Born: Pieter Winsemius; 7 March 1942 (age 84) Voorburg, Netherlands
- Party: People's Party for Freedom and Democracy (from 1982)
- Children: 3 children
- Parent: Albert Winsemius (1910–1996) (father)
- Education: Leiden University (Bachelor of Science, Bachelor of Business Administration, Master of Science, Master of Business Administration, Doctor of Philosophy, Doctor of Science)
- Occupation: Politician · civil servant · physicist · researcher · businessman · management consultant · corporate director · nonprofit director · academic administrator · activist · lobbyist · author · professor

Pieter Winsemius (born 7 March 1942) is a retired Dutch politician of the People's Party for Freedom and Democracy (VVD) and businessman.

Winsemius worked as a researcher at the Leiden University from February 1966 until October 1970 and as a management consultant at the McKinsey & Company from October 1970 until November 1982. After the election of 1982 Winsemius was appointed as Minister of Housing, Spatial Planning and the Environment in the Cabinet Lubbers I, taking office on 4 November 1982. After the election of 1986 Winsemius was not given a ministerial post in the new cabinet. The Cabinet Lubbers I was replaced by the Cabinet Lubbers II on 14 July 1986.

Winsemius semi-retired from active politics and returned to the private sector and the public sector and occupied numerous seats as a corporate director and nonprofit director on several board of directors and supervisory boards (World Wide Fund for Nature, Vereniging Natuurmonumenten, Stichting Max Havelaar, European Centre for Nature Conservation, Stichting Pensioenfonds ABP and the Energy Research Centre) and served on several state commissions and councils on behalf of the government (Organisation for Scientific Research, National Insurance Bank, Staatsbosbeheer, Meteorological Institute and the Scientific Council for Government Policy). Winsemius also returned as a senior management consultant of the McKinsey & Company from August 1986 until October 1992 and served as a distinguished professor of Environmental management at the Tilburg University from 1 October 1999 until 1 September 2012. Winsemius was appointed again as Minister of Housing, Spatial Planning and the Environment in the caretaker Cabinet Balkenende III following the resignation of Sybilla Dekker, taking office on 26 September 2006. The Cabinet Balkenende III was replaced by the Cabinet Balkenende IV on 22 February 2007.

Following the end of his active political career, Winsemius again returned to the private sector and the public sector and resumed his previous positions (Vereniging Natuurmonumenten, Energy Research Centre, Stichting Pensioenfonds ABP and the Scientific Council for Government Policy) and as an advocate, lobbyist and activist for Conservation, Environmentalism, Sustainable development and Climate change issues.

== Political career ==
Winsemius is the son of economist Albert Winsemius. Trained as a physics scientist, and active as partner in the business consultancy firm McKinsey, he was Minister of Housing, Spatial Planning and the Environment (VROM) in the First Lubbers cabinet, on behalf of the VVD. As a young minister, he brought environmental laws to effect, including the rules for environmental impact assessments. After his ministerial period, he became chairman of the Vereniging Natuurmonumenten.

On 22 September 2006, he again became minister of VROM, temporarily succeeding Sybilla Dekker during the Third Balkenende cabinet, until a completely new government had been formed on 22 February 2007 and he was succeeded by Jacqueline Cramer. Since 2003 until 21 November 2012, he has been member of the Scientific Council for Government Policy, for which he was awarded the grade of Commander of the Order of Orange-Nassau upon his retirement.

Winsemius has written books about management and social issues, including Speel nooit een uitwedstrijd (lit. 'never play away games') (1988), in which he compared managing to professional soccer. During the 1980s, Winsemius was co-host of the television show Aktua in bedrijf.

== Academic career ==
Since October 1999, Winsemius holds a professorate for Management of Sustainable Development, at the Tilburg University. On 7 March 2007, he was elected as most influential sustainable Dutchman in the De Duurzame 100 investigation by the newspaper Trouw and broadcasting group LLink.

== Decorations ==
Honours
Ribbon bar	Honour	Country	Date	Comment
	Knight of the Order of the Netherlands Lion	Netherlands	26 August 1986	
	Commander of the Order of Orange-Nassau	Netherlands	21 November 2012	

Political offices
Preceded by Erwin Nypels as Minister of Housing and Spatial Planning	Minister of Housing, Spatial; Planning and the Environment; 1982–1986; 2006–2007	Succeeded by Ed Nijpels
Preceded by Karla Peijs; Ad interim	Minister of Housing, Spatial; Planning and the Environment; 1982–1986; 2006–2007	Succeeded by Jacqueline Cramer
Civic offices
Preceded by Hans Wiegel	Chairman of the Supervisory board of the Advisory Council for Spatial Planning; 1991–2003	Unknown
Non-profit organization positions
Preceded by Theo Quené	Chairman of the Supervisory board of Vereniging Natuurmonumenten; 1988–1998	Succeeded by Herman Wijffels
