= New Zealand Defence College =

Krishno

New Zealand Command and Staff College
- Type: Military college
- Established: 1950
- Affiliations: Massey University
- Postgraduates: Master in International Security
- Location: Trentham Military Camp, Upper Hutt (near Wellington)., New Zealand; 41.1423°S 175.0358°E
- Website: www.nzdf.mil.nz

The New Zealand Command and Staff College (NZCSC) is the premier educational institute for the New Zealand Defence Force (NZDF) and is located at Trentham Military Camp, Upper Hutt (near Wellington). The New Zealand Command and Staff College provides professional military education to New Zealand Defence Force officers which prepares officers for command and staff appointments.

== History ==
The college was established at Whenuapai, near Auckland, in 1950, as a school for junior officers of the RNZAF. In 2004, the college moved to its present location in Trentham Military Camp, Upper Hutt near Wellington, New Zealand.

== Courses ==
Courses follow a modular approach that incorporate the following core subjects: Communication Skills, Operational Studies, Strategic Studies, International Relations, Command, Leadership and Management. Due to the college's close association with Massey University, it is able to offer to successful graduates of the Advanced Command and Staff Course (Joint) the delivery, by Massey University's Centre for Defence and Security Studies, of 150 credits of the 180 credits required for gaining a Masters in International Security.

== See also ==
- New Zealand military ranks
- Royal New Zealand Air Force Museum
- Military history of New Zealand
- New Zealand Air Training Corps (ATC)
- Australian and New Zealand Army Corps
- QEII Army Memorial Museum at Waiouru
- New Zealand Cadet Corps
- History of New Zealand
- New Zealand Sea Cadet Corps
