= Tan Cheng Bock =

Singaporean politician

- 陈清木
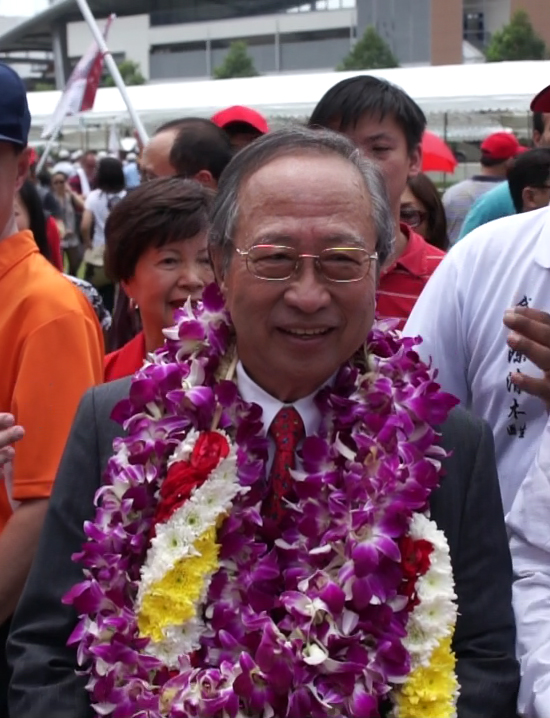
- Tan during the 2011 presidential election

2nd Chairman of the Progress Singapore Party
- In office 1 April 2021 – 5 July 2025
- Secretary-General: Francis Yuen (2021–2023); Leong Mun Wai (2023–2024, since 2025); Hazel Poa (2024–2025)
- Preceded by: Wang Swee Chuang
- Succeeded by: A’bas bin Kasmani

1st Secretary-General of the Progress Singapore Party
- In office 28 March 2019 – 31 March 2021
- Preceded by: Position established
- Succeeded by: Francis Yuen

Member of the Singapore Parliament for Ayer Rajah SMC
- In office 23 December 1980 – 20 April 2006
- Preceded by: Constituency established
- Succeeded by: Constituency abolished
- Majority: 1980: 9,930 (66.78%); 1984: 9,475 (50.88%); 1988: 8,335 (39.10%); 1991: 10,067 (50.32%); 1997: 9,550 (46.34%); 2001: 12,967 (75.92%)

Personal details
- Born: Tan Cheng Bock; 26 April 1940 (age 86) Singapore, Straits Settlements
- Party: Progress Singapore Party
- Other political affiliations: Independent (2011–2019); People's Action Party (1980–2011)
- Spouse: Cecilia Lee Choon Lian
- Children: 2
- Education: University of Singapore (MBBS)
- Occupation: Politician
- Profession: General practitioner

Adrian Tan Cheng Bock (Note: Chinese: 陈清木; Pe̍h-ōe-jī: Tân Chheng-bo̍k; pinyin: Chén Qīngmù) (born 26 April 1940) is a Singaporean former politician and physician who was the secretary-general of the Progress Singapore Party (PSP) between 2019 and 2021 and its chairperson between 2021 and 2025.

As a member of the governing People's Action Party (PAP), he was the Member of Parliament (MP) for Ayer Rajah Single Member Constituency (SMC) between 1980 and 2006. He left politics before the 2006 general election and later left the PAP to contest the 2011 presidential election, losing marginally with 34.85% of the vote to Tony Tan in a four-cornered fight.

Tan founded the PSP in 2019. It did not win any seats in the 2020 or 2025 general elections, but was awarded two non-constituency MP seats in 2020 after its team for West Coast Group Representation Constituency (GRC), led by Tan himself, won 48.31% of the vote, the closest result in the general election. He announced his retirement from politics shortly after the 2025 general election, but has remained a PSP member.

== Early life and education ==
Tan was born on 26 April 1940 in Singapore. He was the third child out of six children.

Tan attended Radin Mas Primary School and Raffles Institution (RI). He graduated from the University of Singapore in 1968 with a Bachelor of Medicine and Surgery.

When Tan was 16, his father, a clerk with the Singapore Harbour Board, died from tuberculosis. As the father was a member of the Singapore Harbour Union, the family was entitled to a benevolent fund of $28,000. However, the union refused to pay, claiming that the father was not a member, as he had failed to pay his subscription fee. After Tan found receipts proving otherwise and sought legal aid, the family received $14,000, half of the fund, from the union.

== Medical career ==
Tan started his first clinic, Ama Keng Clinic, in Lim Chu Kang in 1971. He has served as the Chairman of the Society of Private Practice, as a Council Member of the College of General Practitioners, as Committee Member on the Council of the Singapore Medical Association (SMA), as Chairman of the SMA Trust Fund, as board member of SMA's Ethics Committee, as SMA's Representative on the Ministry of Health's Committee on the Regulation of Medical Clinics, and as a part-time clinical teacher in general practice at the National University of Singapore.

== Political career ==
=== 1980–2011: People's Action Party ===
Tan entered politics during the 1980 general election under the People's Action Party's banner, and became the Member of Parliament-elect for the Ayer Rajah SMC with a vote of 83%. Tan's subsequent election results with an average of 77% was perceived as one of the best-performing candidates in Singapore, with his best-ever score being his last election in 2001, with 88%.

While in Parliament, he served as the Chairman of the Government Parliamentary Committees (GPCs) for Education (1987–90), National Development (1991–95) and the Environment (1995–97), and was the Co-ordinating Chairman for all GPCs between 1987 and 1988. He was also a member of the GPCs for Communications (1997–2000) and Defence and Foreign Affairs (2001–06). Tan was the Leader of the Singapore-European Parliamentary Group between 1991 and 1996 and Singapore-SEA Parliamentary Group between 1997 and 2006. From 1987 to 1996, he was an elected member of the PAP Central Executive Committee, the highest ruling committee within the PAP. Tan stepped down as a Member of Parliament at the 2006 general election. He also served as Chairman of the Jurong East Town Council from 1989 to 1991, Chairman of the West Coast–Ayer Rajah Town Council from 2001 to 2004, Chairman of the Bukit Timah Community Development Council from 1997 to 2000, and Chairman of the Feedback Unit at the Ministry of Community Development from 1985 to 1989.

Firmly believing in the value of diverse perspectives and the importance of giving Singaporeans a voice in the nation's governance, he established the first governmental feedback unit, now known as REACH, in 1985.

In 2006, Tan's Ayer Rajah SMC was absorbed into West Coast Group Representation Constituency (GRC). Citing his health concerns, Tan stepped down from active politics.

==== CPF for Tertiary Education ====
In 1988, Tan, as GPC Chairman for Education, led a team of MPs to argue for the use of the Central Provident Fund (CPF) for education, as an appreciable number of able students were not able to enter local universities due to limited places. Tan felt that education was a form of investment and that all his GPC was asking for was an extra option for CPF members, to let them decide whether to put their investible savings in stocks and shares or in education. Chief argument against the idea was that the use of such retirement savings may leave the account holder with an insufficient amount at the end of his or her working life. Minister for Labour Lee Yock Suan said that there were alternatives available such as soft loan schemes which were interest-free. In answer to Tan's claim that Lee had not clearly stated his position on the issue despite the idea being first mentioned years ago, Lee insisted that his position had always been plain, that he "was against it, but you have pressed me to study it and I shall". The set of guidelines on the use of CPF for Education proposed by the GPC was eventually implemented, paving the way for the beginnings of a wave of Singaporean students studying at local tertiary institutions.

==== Free parking ====
Tan also convinced the Ministry of National Development (MND) to allow Singaporeans to park their cars for free in Housing & Development Board (HDB) estates on Sundays and public holidays, to promote family togetherness.

In early 2010, Tan volunteered himself to help residents in Sentosa Cove to meet with Sentosa Development Corporation (SDC) to seek a waiver of the gantry entry charge (S$2 to S$7 depending on the entry time) for visitors to their residences to the Sentosa island. His efforts, however, did not bear immediate fruits. Later in October 2010, the SDC offered to cap the entry charge at a concession rate of S$3.

==== Nominated Member of Parliament Scheme ====
Tan voted against the PAP whip on the scheme of Nominated Members of Parliament (NMPs).

==== Think Singaporeans First ====
In 1999, when Singapore was recovering from the 1997 Asian financial crisis, and experiencing labour talent shortages in several key sectors, the PAP pushed for a stronger intake of foreign talent to fill the ranks. Although not against this rationale, Tan argued that the Singapore government should tone down its calls for the recruitment of foreign talent and reassure Singaporeans that they came first, which earned him strong rebuttals, including one from George Yeo and a stern rebuke from Lee Kuan Yew.

==== No Blank Cheque ====
In 1985, he made a speech in Parliament about "no more blank cheque" for the ruling party which he revisited on his blog in May 2011.

=== 2011–2017: As an independent ===
After the 2011 general elections, Tan said in a speech at the 52nd Singapore Medical Association Annual Dinner that he had given advice to opposition candidates, including Tan Jee Say, on how to campaign in the elections when they approached him.

In May 2011, he resigned from the PAP to stand as a candidate in the 2011 presidential election.

=== 2018–present: Progress Singapore Party ===
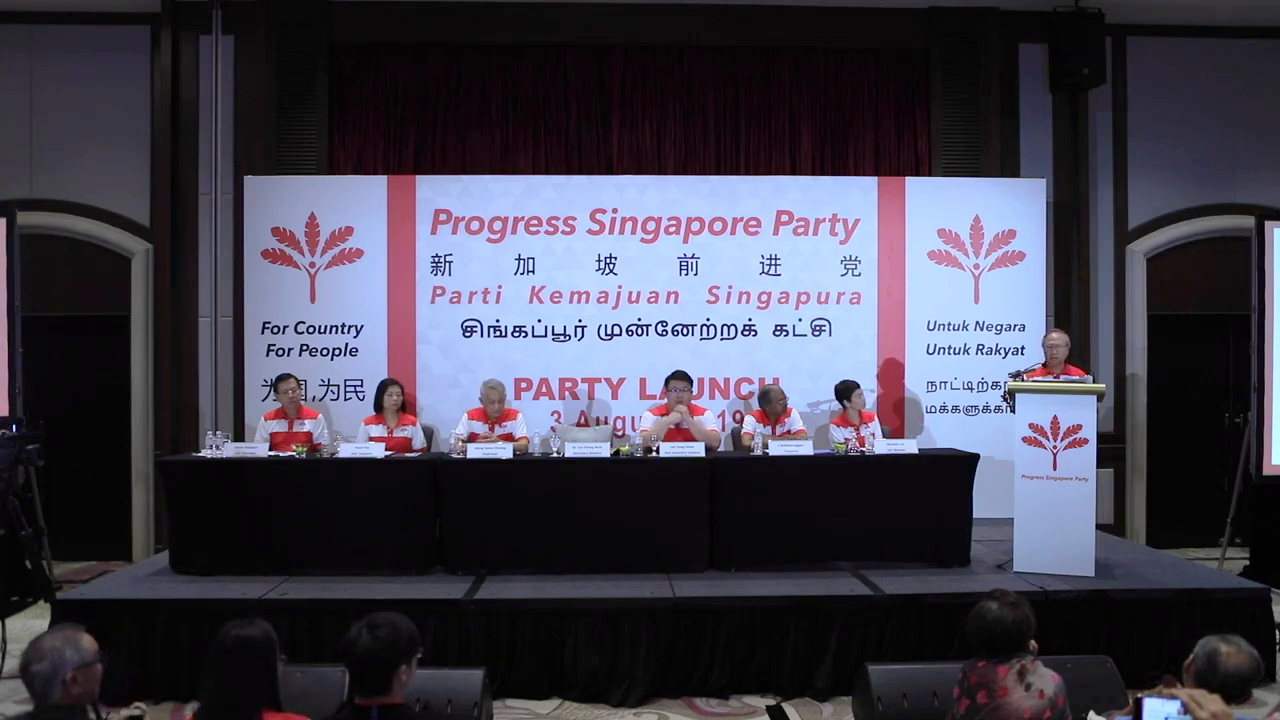
Tan inaugurating the Progress Singapore Party

In 2018, Tan led a gathering along with seven opposition parties (Singapore Democratic Party, Reform Party, Singaporeans First, People's Power Party, Democratic Progressive Party, National Solidarity Party, and a new party formed by former NSP chief Lim Tean, Peoples Voice) to plan a possible coalition for the upcoming election.

On 19 January 2019, Tan filed an application to form a new political party called the Progress Singapore Party, alongside 12 other applicants, to be an "added voice in parliament".

Progress Singapore Party was officially launched on 3 August 2019. This launch was covered by mainstream local and foreign media, including alternative media. The official launch was broadcast live to the public at 1.30pm. Tan asked Singaporeans, PRs and New Singapore Citizens to step forward together to join the Party as members or volunteers to help bring Singapore to the next level so that the younger generation will have a better Singapore.

He served as the first Secretary-General of PSP from its formation in March 2019 to March 2021.

==== 2020 general election ====
Tan along with team members, Leong Mun Wai, Hazel Poa, Nadarajah Loganathan and Jeffrey Khoo contested at West Coast GRC in the 2020 Singaporean general election which contained his former ward of Ayer Rajah but narrowly lost to the incumbent PAP with 48.31% of the vote.

==== 2025 general election ====
Tan along with team members, Leong Mun Wai, Hazel Poa with 2 new faces Sani Ismail and Sumarleki Amjah contested at West Coast–Jurong West GRC in the 2025 general election but lost to the incumbent PAP with 40.01% of the vote. Tan indicate that this is his last election. On 5 July 2025, Tan retired from the CEC and as Chairman of the Progress Singapore Party. He was replaced by A'bas bin Kasmani.

== Business career ==
=== Appointment to Chuan Hup ===
Tan's appointment as non-executive chairman of Chuan Hup Holdings (CHH) Ltd in 1991 was unusual at the time, as Members of Parliament did not normally hold such positions. Prime Minister Goh Chok Tong, who had been a classmate of Tan's in Raffles Institution, later said that he had initially been inclined to say no to Tan's request because Tan was a medical practitioner with no experience in shipping.

Goh ultimately agreed to the appointment, but in the letter he sent to Tan made clear his reservations: Goh later confirmed that neither Tan nor his company had ever tried to take advantage of his position.

=== Current appointments ===
Tan is the Chairman of Dredging International Asia Pacific Pte Ltd, a position he held since 1997.

=== Past corporate appointments ===
His past corporate appointments include

- ING Asia Private Bank (2008–09)
- M&C REIT Management Ltd (2006–10)
- M&C Business Trust Management Ltd (2006–10)
- Jurong Health Services (up to 2011)
- Jurong Medical Centre (up to 2011)
- Provisional MRT Transit Authority (1983)
- Mass Rapid Transit Corporation (1983–85)
- SMRT (1987–95)
- Land Transport Authority (1995–2005)
- Chuan Hup Holdings (1991–2011)

== Presidential campaigns ==
=== 2011 ===
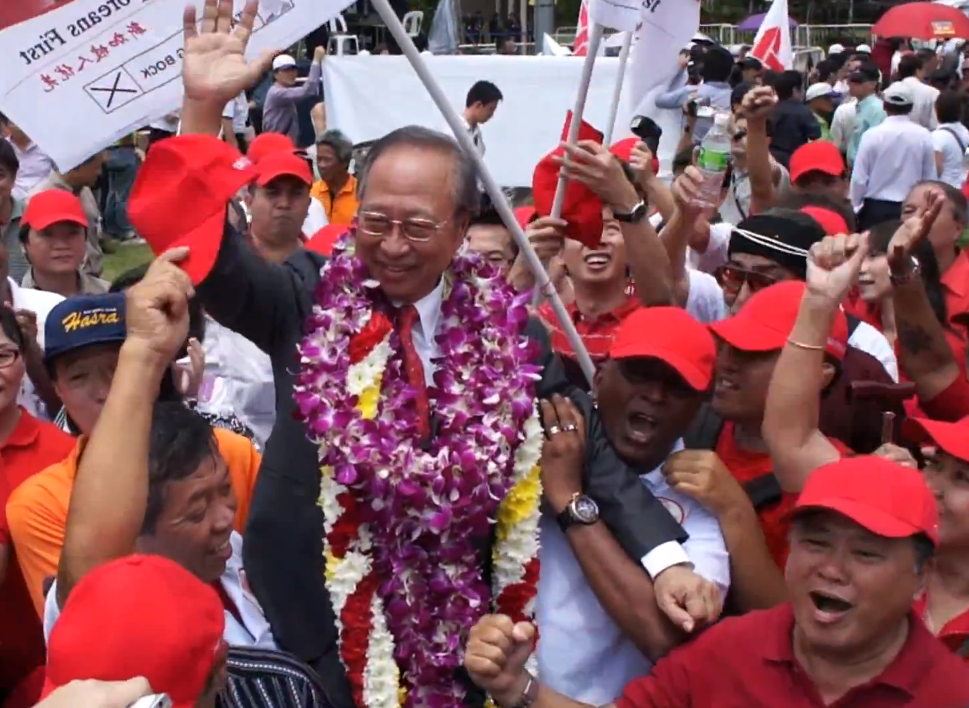
Tan Cheng Bock at the Nomination Centre, carried by supporters.

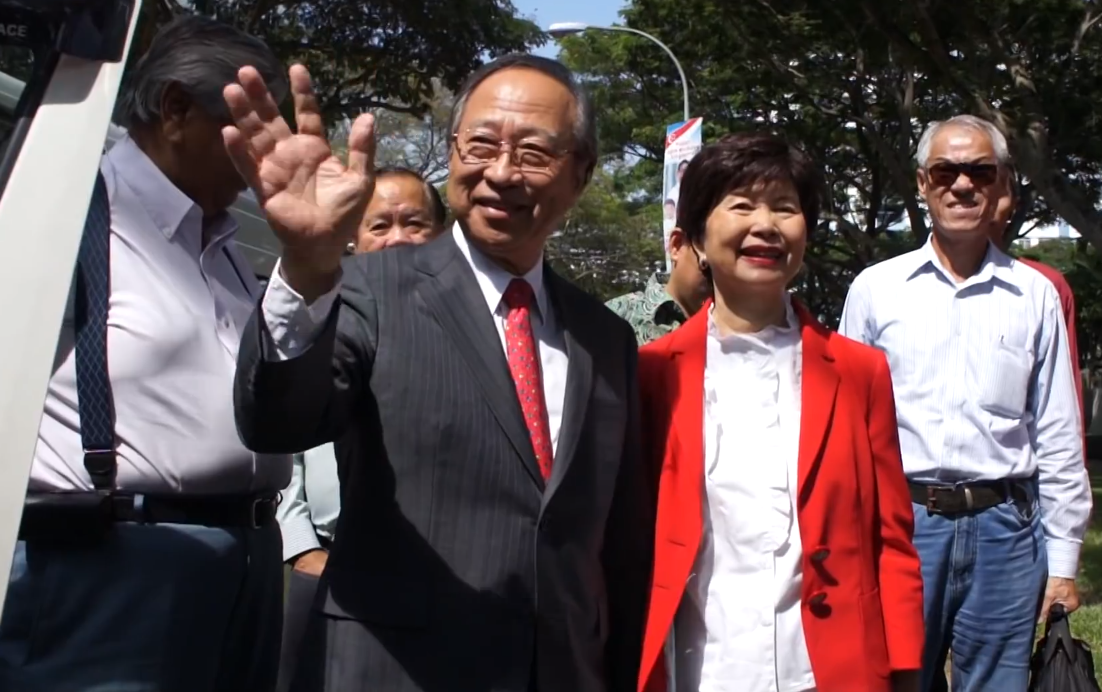
Tan Cheng Bock, with Cecilia Tan, waving to reporters after disembarking from the van at the Nomination Centre.

On 27 May 2011, 20 days after the recent general election, Tan was the first candidate to seek candidacy for the forthcoming Presidential Election; he resigned from PAP earlier that month prior to the announcement (per the constitution, candidates running for the presidential election must be a nonpartisan, independent candidate, and should not affiliate or to represent to any political party). On 22 July 2011, Tan submitted the presidency forms.

Ahead of the nomination day (due to be held on 17 August), despite anticipation for a strong contest against the other potential rivals who also announced their candidacy (former Deputy Prime Minister Tony Tan, and NTUC Income Chief Executive Officer Tan Kin Lian), he filed his applications on 22 July, and on 11 August, was one of the four candidates (the aforementioned three, plus former Singapore Democratic Party candidate Tan Jee Say) to be granted the Certificate of Eligibility, an item required to complete their nominations during Nomination Day. The four-cornered fight marked only the second presidential election in history (the first was in 1993) with a contest, as the two preceding presidential elections (1999 and 2005) were both uncontested walkovers.

Tan stated that he would promote multiracialism, if elected.

Controversy erupted shortly after Tan declared his interest in the presidency. It was revealed that in a Straits Times article dated back in 1987, Tan had spoken regarding the Singaporean government's controversial Operation Spectrum while he was in Parliament, which saw 22 young Roman Catholic church and social activists and professionals detained without trial. He addressed, in his capacity as Feedback Unit chief, that most Singaporeans had accepted the reasons of the government and the Internal Security Department for the detention. He also reported that certain "solid citizens" were sceptical of the detention. On 4 June 2011, Tan's Facebook administrator cited that as posts on his page about the incident were running contrary to what law courts have ruled, the risk of being sued for defamation was open to both hosts of the site and people behind the posts alike, as such, "(they) are obliged to remove posts that run contrary to what the law courts have ruled."

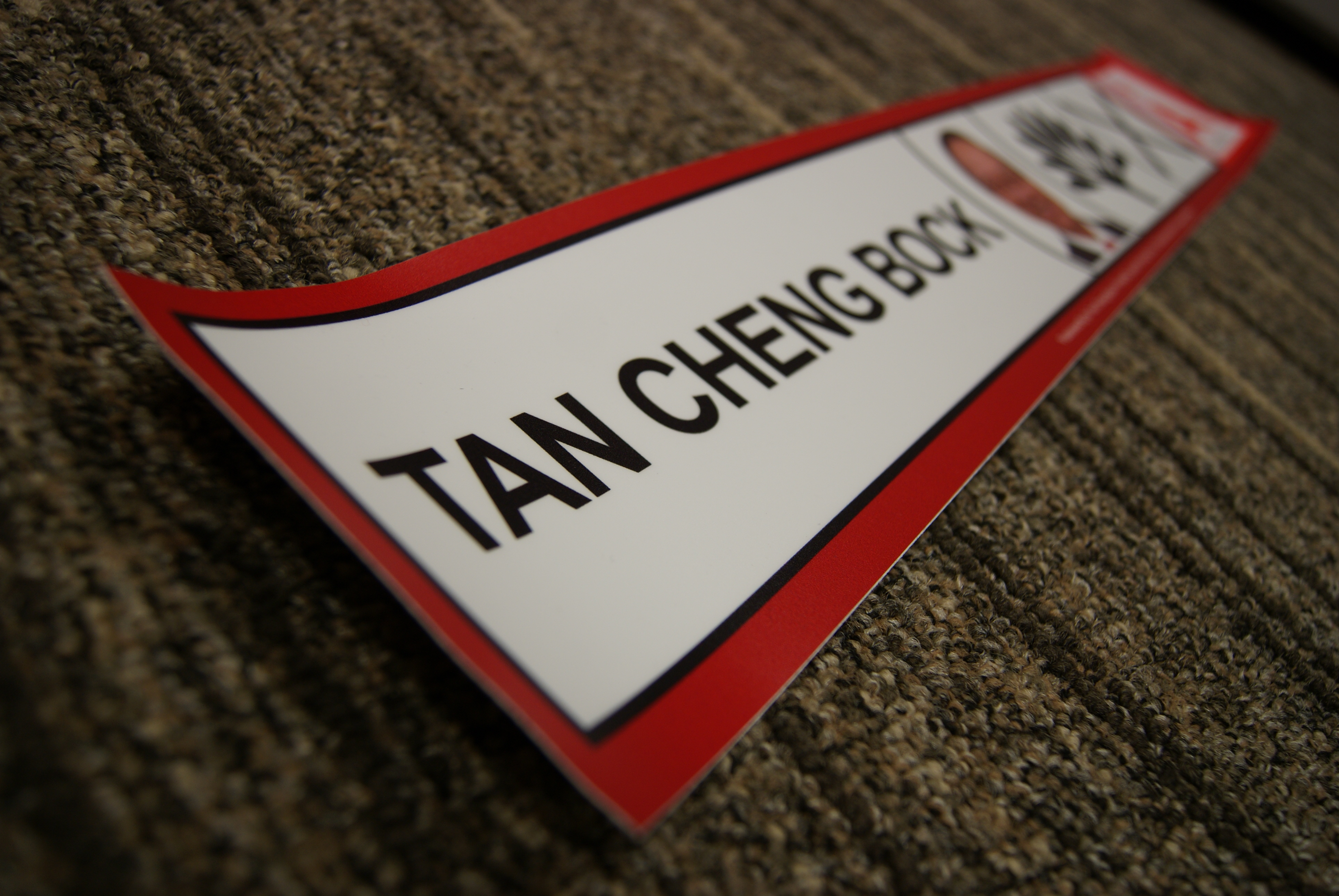
A bumper sticker produced by Tan for his presidential bid

In the presidential candidate broadcast, Tan said, "The President must be above politics" and that "he must not be a proxy to be any political party", as "his interest must be national, not with a political agenda in mind".

He also proposed that the government and the Prime Minister's Office be separated as "this familiarity attracts unwanted suspicion of undue influence". He emphasised that the separation is a symbolic move required to reassure the people that they are independent of each other.

Tan also proposed an annual statement for greater transparency for Singaporeans to better understand the president's activities and ideas in unifying Singapore. The statement also touches on Singapore's reserves and the rationale behind the appointment or vetoing of civil servants.

Tan's campaign slogan was "Think Singaporeans First", a reference to his 1999 debate on the need to prioritise Singaporeans first when faced with prevailing foreign talent policy.

Tan's election symbol was a palm tree, based on a Ravenala madagascariensis.

Tan's selected the palm tree as his symbol, explaining that "The leaves of the palm represents our multiracial society, the trunk represents them coming together, and the roots represents us taking root in Singapore."

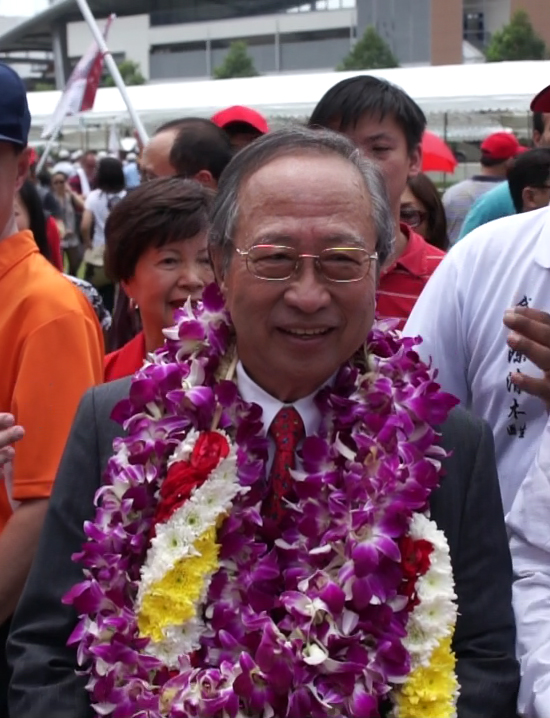
Tan Cheng Bock at the Nomination Centre.

On 27 August, Singapore went to choose their seventh and newly elected candidate. About five hours after polls closed, at 1.23am, Tan called Election Department for an Election recount; due to a narrow margin with less than 2% between the top two highest candidates (the other was Tony Tan), ELD approved Tan's request, and vote counting went on for around three hours before the results were finalised.

At 4.10am, the final results saw Tan Cheng Bock losing the election marginally to Tony Tan by a 0.35% margin (7,269 votes); Cheng Bock garnered 737,128 (34.85% out of the 2,115,118 valid) votes, while Tony garnered 744,397 votes (35.20%).

Tan requested a second counting of votes and accepted the results and tried to stand again for 2017 Singaporean presidential election. However, changes made to the criteria of candidates rendered him ineligible. In a congratulatory Facebook post published on 13 September 2017, Tan said that the elected Halimah Yacob would assume "...the most controversial presidency in the history of Singapore."

=== 2017 ===
In March 2016, Tan declared his intention to run again for president in the next presidential election, which had to be held within the next 17 months.

In September 2016, the eligibility criteria for the elected presidency was revised to include the "reserved election" (an election made exclusive for one particular race; in the case, Malay candidates), and were passed by the Constitution in November 2016, eventually preventing Tan from running in the election.

In May 2017, three months before the elections, Tan filed a constitutional challenge to the High Court, to determine whether it is correct to set the election as a reserved election under the newly introduced amendments to the Elected Presidency, and whether Wee Kim Wee (the fourth Singapore's president) is counted as one six-year term since the constitution for the elected presidency was instated in 1991, but the High Court's Justice Quentin Loh dismissed his challenge, providing an explanation that "Article 164(1)(a) provides for Parliament to specify the first term of office of the President to be counted under Art 19B(1)" ("First Term"). Tan later appealed to the Court on 31 July, but the court of the five judges unanimously dismissed his appeal on 23 August, ruling that the Parliament has their full discretion to set the First Term, which President Wee was counted as one term of Presidency.

The election ended with a walkover after former Parliamentary Speaker Halimah Yacob became the sole candidate to be granted the Certificate of Eligibility, and was inaugurated on 14 September. After the nomination day, he, along with potential candidates such as Farid Khan and Salleh Marican, also congratulated Halimah on her victory.

=== 2023 ===
On 27 August 2023, Tan Cheng Bock, acting in his personal capacity, endorsed Tan Kin Lian in the 2023 presidential election. Tan had been his rival in the 2011 presidential election.

== Charity work ==
Tan has been involved in Charity Organisations such as the Tsao Organisation (2000–2009), Centre for Third Age Ltd (2007–2011), Disabled People's Association (1985–2006), Handicap Welfare Association (1986–2006) and the Credit Counselling Singapore (2002–2007).. In January 2012, he sang in the Meet The Entrepreneur Charity Concert together with 40 other Singapore entrepreneurs like Andrew Chow to say that "If you ever change your mind, come back to me in 2016, I will be back to fight again, please understand".

== Personal life ==
Tan is married to Cecilia Lee Choon Lian. They have a son and a daughter.

In 2005, Tan developed meningitis and was hospitalised for two weeks.

== Awards and decorations ==
Tan has been awarded numerous accolades from various organisations.

- Sreenivasan Orator, Singapore Medical Association (SMA)
- Orator, Obstetrics & Gynaecology Society
- Fellow, College of Family Practitioners
- Honorary Member, Singapore Medical Association
- Honorary Member, Republic of Singapore Yacht Club
- Governor, Tower Club
- Honoured – 100 Rafflesians (1823–2003)
