= Marymount Single Member Constituency =

Electoral division in Singapore

Marymount
- Single-member constituency for the Parliament of Singapore
- Region: Central Region, Singapore
- Electorate: 23,275

Current constituency
- Created: 2020; 6 years ago
- Seats: 1
- Party: People's Action Party
- Member: Gan Siow Huang
- Town Council: Bishan–Toa Payoh
- Created from: Bishan–Toa Payoh GRC

The Marymount Single Member Constituency (Note: Malay: Kawasan Undi Perseorangan Marymount; Chinese: 玛利蒙单选区; Tamil: மேரிமவுண்ட் தனித்தொகுதி) is a single-member constituency (SMC) situated in central Singapore. It is managed by Bishan–Toa Payoh Town Council (BTPTC). The current Member of Parliament (MP) is Gan Siow Huang from the People's Action Party (PAP).

== History ==
Prior to the 2020 general election, Marymount SMC was carved from Bishan–Toa Payoh Group Representation Constituency (GRC); the five-seat GRC lost a seat to become a four-seat one. Incumbent Bishan–Toa Payoh GRC MP Josephine Teo, who had been representing areas located in the SMC, was redeployed to Jalan Besar GRC, a move she called "renewal" of the PAP. Gan, then a political newcomer, was sent to contest the SMC, retained the SMC with 55.04% of the vote against Ang Yong Guan from the Progress Singapore Party (PSP).

In the 2025 general election, Gan stood for re-election in the SMC. She won the election consecutively for the second time and have defeated Jeffrey Khoo from the PSP with an improved 70.73% of the vote.

== Member of Parliament ==
Interactive map of Marymount SMC as of the 2025 general election

Year	Member	Party
Formation
2020	Gan Siow Huang	PAP
2025	Gan Siow Huang	PAP

== Electoral results ==
Note: The Elections Department does not include rejected votes when calculating the vote shares of candidates. Hence, all candidates' vote shares will total to 100% at any given election (may not appear so in multi-way contests due to rounding).

=== Elections in 2020s ===
General Election 2020
Party	Candidate	Votes	%
PAP	Gan Siow Huang	12,173	55.04
PSP	Ang Yong Guan	9,943	44.96
Majority		2,230	10.08
Total valid votes		22,116	98.64
Rejected ballots		305	1.36
Turnout		22,421	95.69
Registered electors		23,431	
PAP win (new seat)			

General Election 2025
Party	Candidate	Votes	%	±%
PAP	Gan Siow Huang	14,954	70.73	▲15.69
PSP	Jeffrey Khoo	6,187	29.27	▼15.69
Majority		8,767	41.46	▲31.38
Total valid votes		21,141	98.83	▲0.19
Rejected ballots		251	1.17	▼0.19
Turnout		21,392	91.91	▼3.78
Registered electors		23,275		▼0.67
PAP hold		Swing	▲15.69	
