= Toa Payoh =

Planning Area and HDB Town in Central Region, Singapore

- Planning Area and Town

Other transcription(s)
  - Chinese: 大巴窑 (Simplified) 大巴窯 (Traditional); Dàbāyáo (Pinyin) (pronounced [tâ.pá.jǎʊ]); Tōa Pa-iô (Hokkien POJ)
  - Malay: Toa Payoh
  - Tamil: தோ பாயோ Tō pāyō (Transliteration)
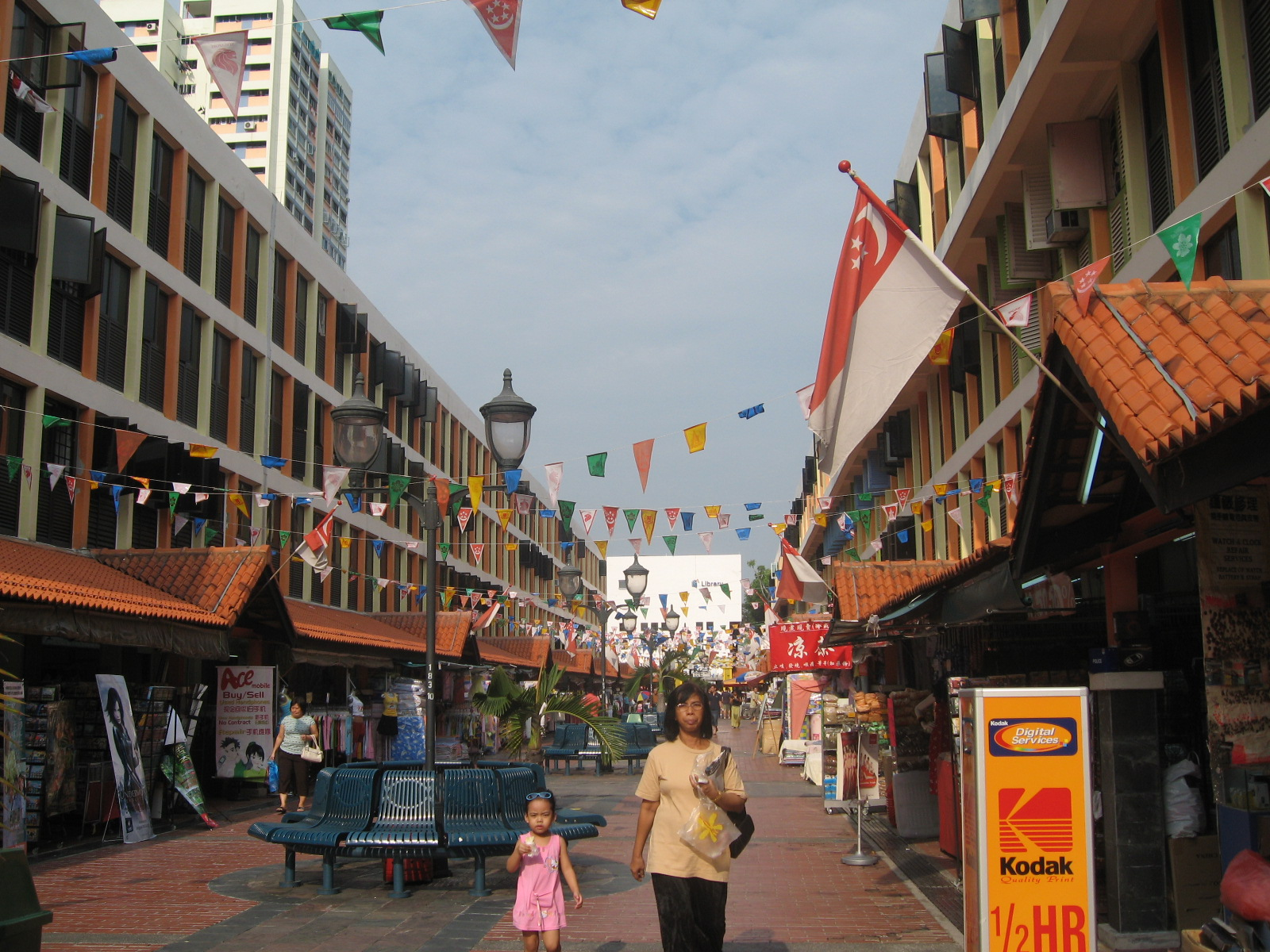
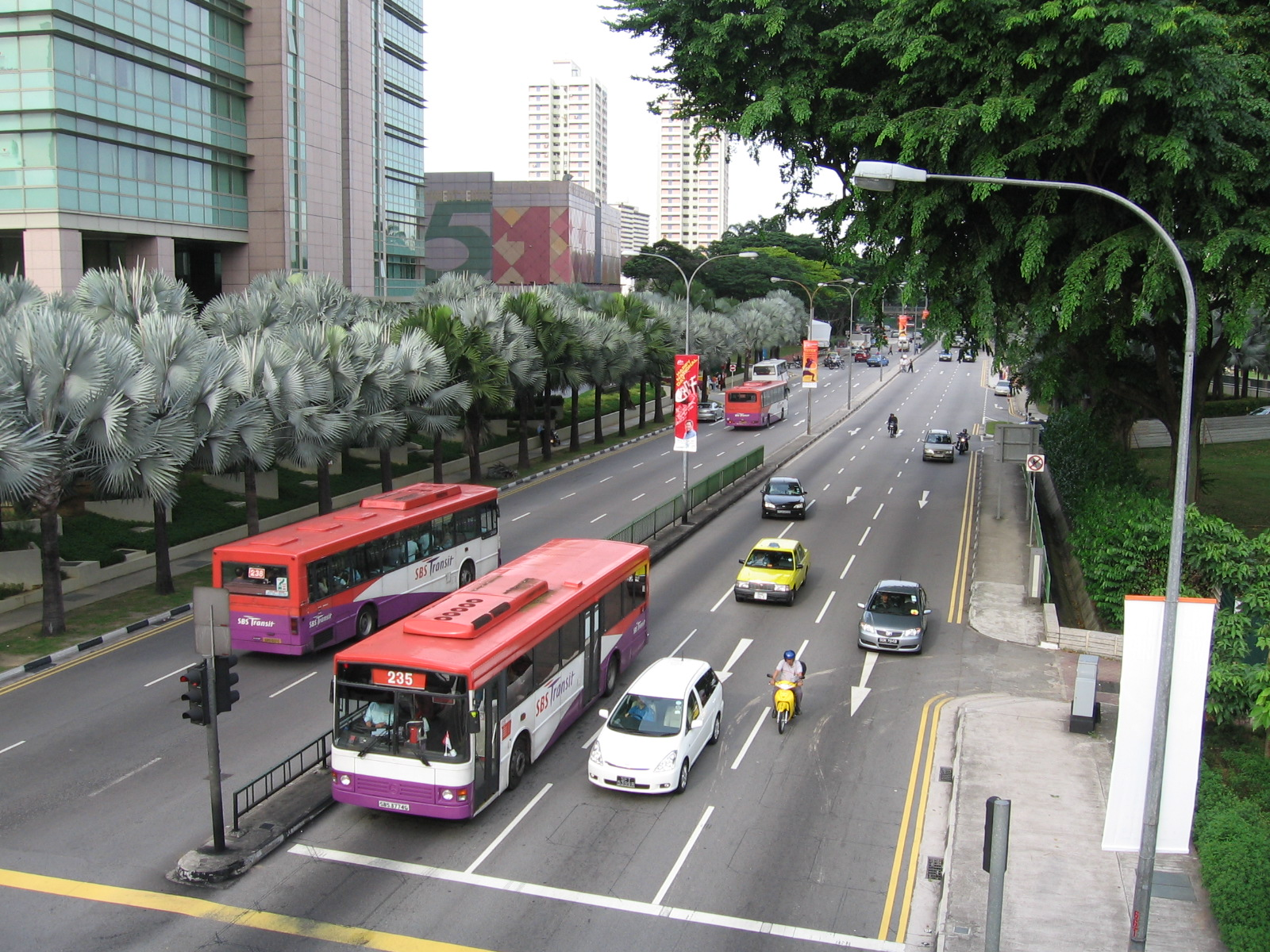
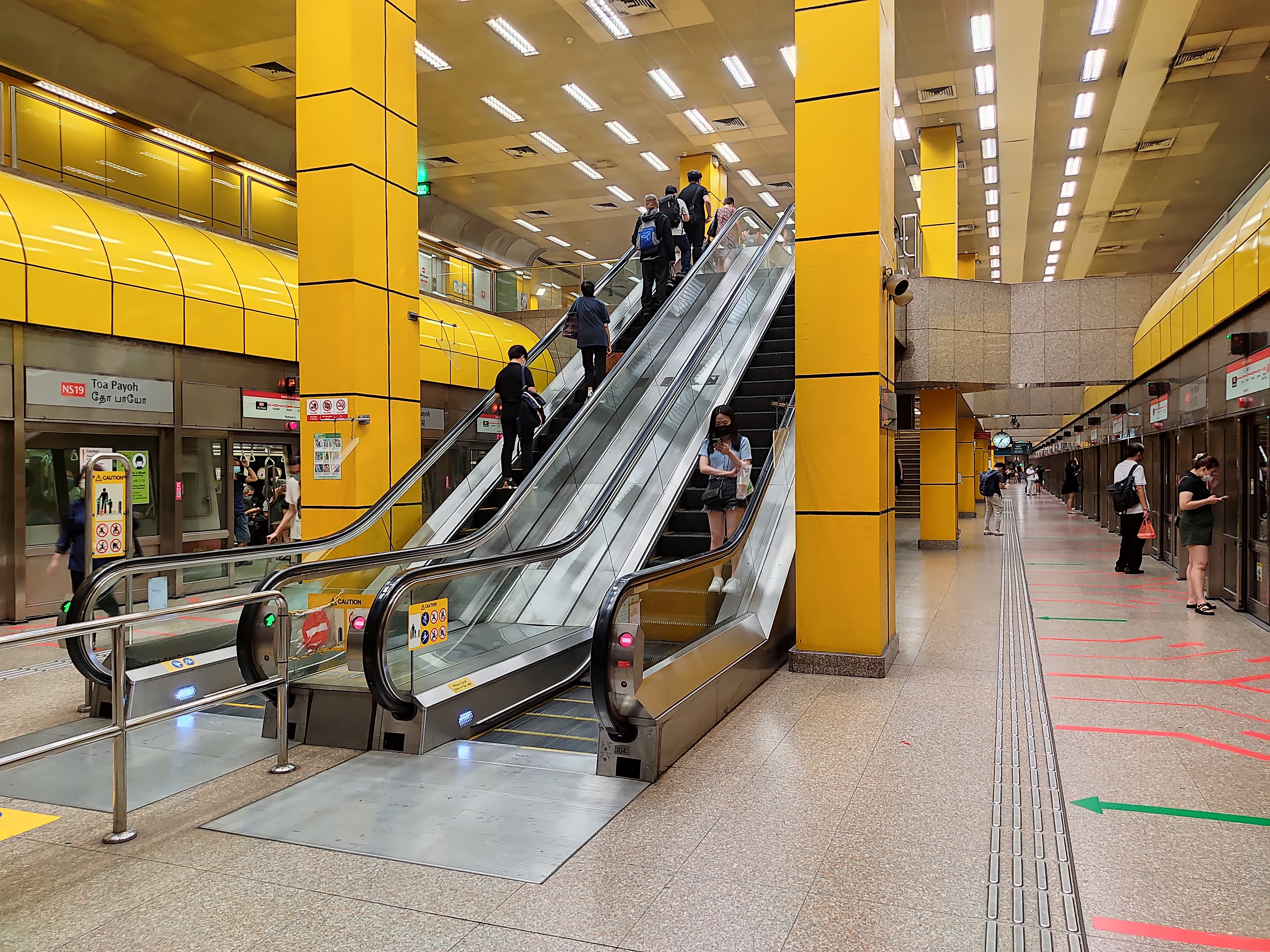
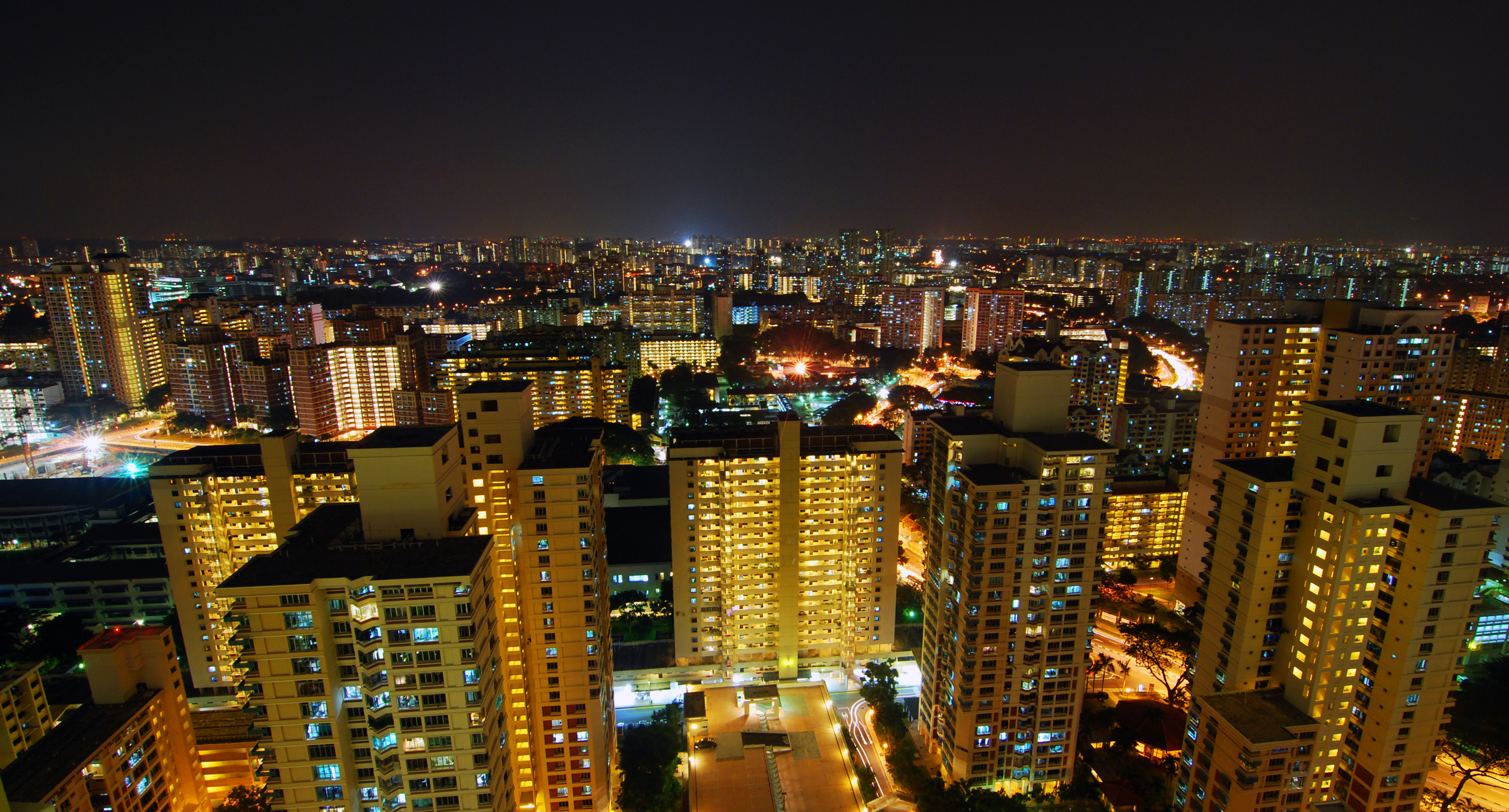
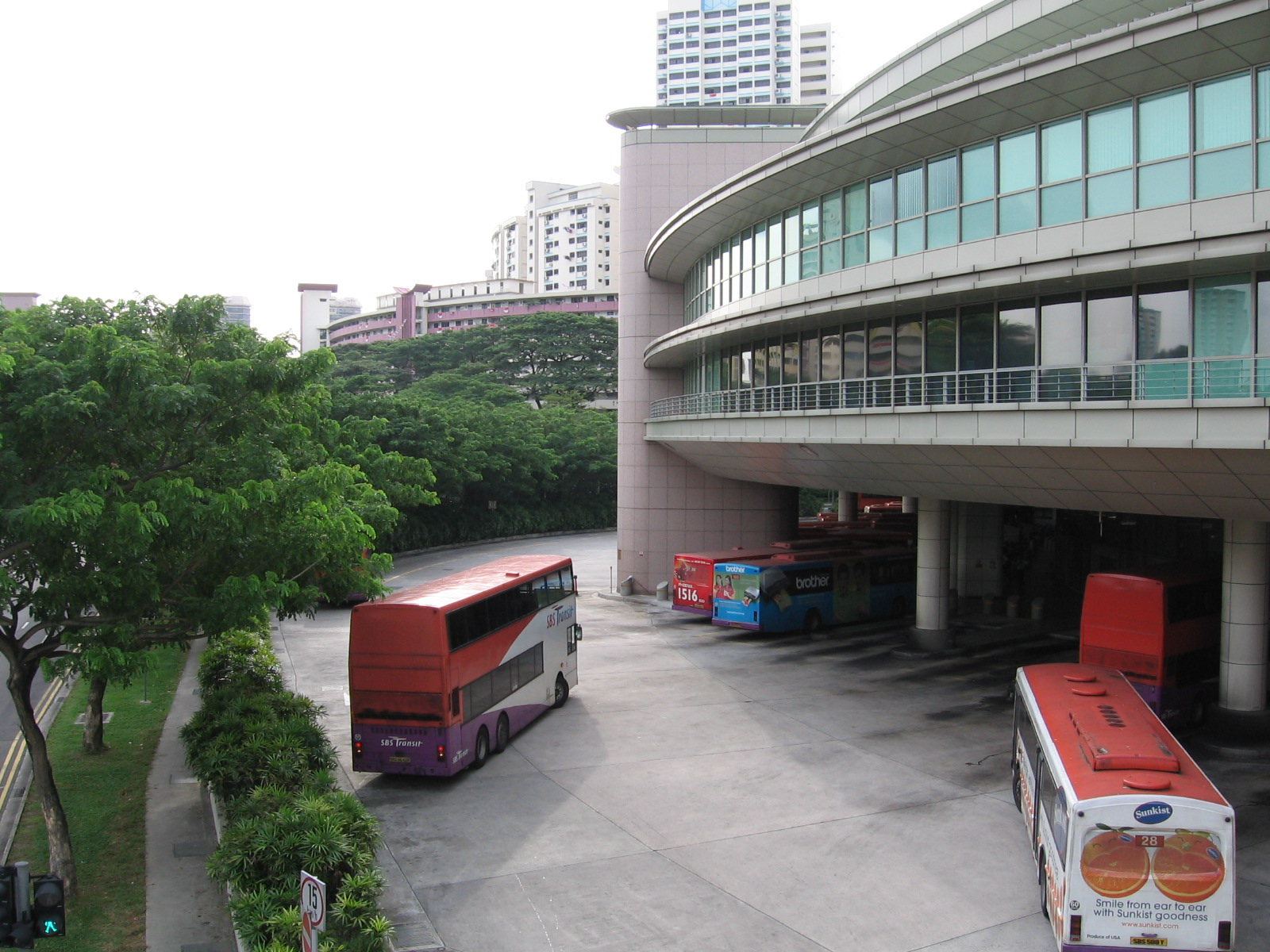
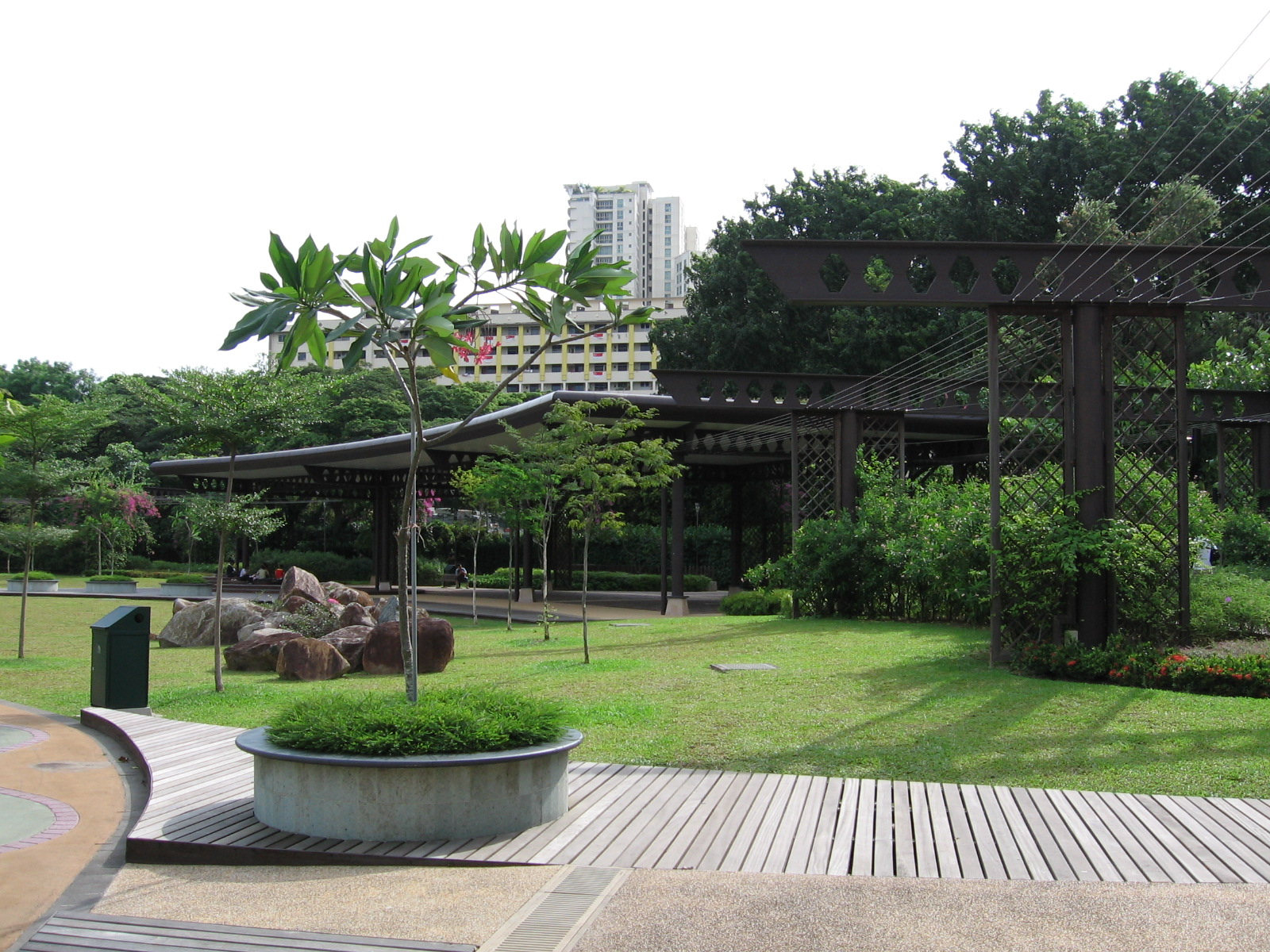
- From top left to right: Toa Payoh Town Centre; Lorong 6 Toa Payoh; Toa Payoh MRT station; Toa Payoh at night with Bishan and Serangoon in the distance; Toa Payoh Bus Interchange; Toa Payoh Town Park

- Location in Central Region

- Location of Toa Payoh within Singapore
- Coordinates: 1.3343°N 103.8563°E
- Country: Singapore
- Region: Central Region
- CDC: Central Singapore CDC; South East CDC
- Town councils: Bishan-Toa Payoh Town Council; Jalan Besar Town Council; Marine Parade-Braddell Heights Town Council
- Constituencies: Bishan–Toa Payoh GRC; Potong Pasir SMC; Marine Parade–Braddell Heights GRC

Government
  - Mayor: Central Singapore CDC: Denise Phua; South East CDC: Dinesh Vasu Dash
  - Members of Parliament: Bishan-Toa Payoh GRC: Cai Yinzhou; Chee Hong Tat; Saktiandi Supaat; Potong Pasir SMC: Alex Yeo; Marine Parade-Braddell Heights GRC: Diana Pang

Area
  - Total: 8.18 km^{2} (3.16 sq mi)
  - Residential: 2.48 km^{2} (0.96 sq mi)
- Elevation: 7.94 m (26.0 ft)

Population (2026)
  - Total: 148,940
  - Density: 18,200/km^{2} (47,200/sq mi)
- Demonym: Official: Toa Payoh resident
- Postal districts: 11, 12, 13
- Dwelling units: 36,439
- Projected ultimate: 61,000

Toa Payoh (IPA: /ˌt(w)ɔː ˈpɑːjoʊ, ˌtoʊ -/ t(w)aw PAH-yoh or toh-, Chinese: 大巴窑 / 大巴窯, Tamil: தோ பாயோ) is a planning area and residential town located in the northern part of the Central Region of Singapore. Toa Payoh planning area borders Bishan and Serangoon to the north, the Central Water Catchment to the northwest, Kallang to the south, Geylang to the southeast, Novena to the west and Hougang to the east. Toa Payoh New Town is situated in the western portion of the Toa Payoh planning area. The latter occupies a much larger area, encompassing estates such as Potong Pasir and Bidadari.

Toa Payoh planning area consists of 12 subzones: Bidadari, Boon Teck, Braddell, Joo Seng, Kim Keat, Lorong 8 Toa Payoh, Pei Chun, Potong Pasir, Sennett, Toa Payoh Central, Toa Payoh West and Woodleigh.

== Etymology ==
Toa Payoh, in Hokkien, translates as "big swamp" (with toa meaning "big" and payoh meaning "swamp"). The Malay word for swamp is paya. It is the Chinese equivalent of Paya Lebar, which translates to "big swamp land".

Toa Payoh's old Chinese name, was known as Ang Chiang San (alternatively An Xiang Shan) or "burial hill". The area was called as such because of the presence of an old cemetery located in the area.

John Turnbull Thomson, a government surveyor, refers to Toa Payoh in his 1849 agricultural report as Toah Pyoh Lye and Toah Pyoh.

Unique to housing estates in Singapore, roads in Toa Payoh are given Malay-language street prefixes, (e.g. "Jalan Toa Payoh", "Lorong Satu Toa Payoh") as when the town was conceived, Singapore was a state of Malaysia.

== History ==
Toa Payoh was once an extensive and notorious squatter district. Most squatters were engaged in farming and rearing pigs. The others were hawkers, factory workers, mechanics or domestic helpers.

The squatters started moving out in 1962 as a result of increased compensation rates and other practical inducements offered by the Government. Clearance work was able to commence and the redevelopment started in early 1964.

Toa Payoh New Town is Singapore's second oldest satellite town and the first to be built by the Housing and Development Board after the development of Queenstown by the Singapore Improvement Trust in the late 1950s. Before its time as a residential town, Toa Payoh was a squatter district, with a prominent agricultural heritage in the area.

Throughout the 1960s up till the beginning of the 1980s, the town, much like Geylang today, was infamous for its vice, being home to some of Singapore's largest crime syndicates and gangs. Notable cases such as the Toa Payoh ritual murders of 1981, in which people were murdered and stuffed into barrels, brought the town widespread attention. As such, Toa Payoh has also been coined by the media as the "Chicago of the East" and the "Chicago of Singapore".

Queen Elizabeth II visited Toa Payoh in 1972 (Block 53 Lorong 5 Toa Payoh) and 2006 (Block 7, Toa Payoh).

== Infrastructure ==
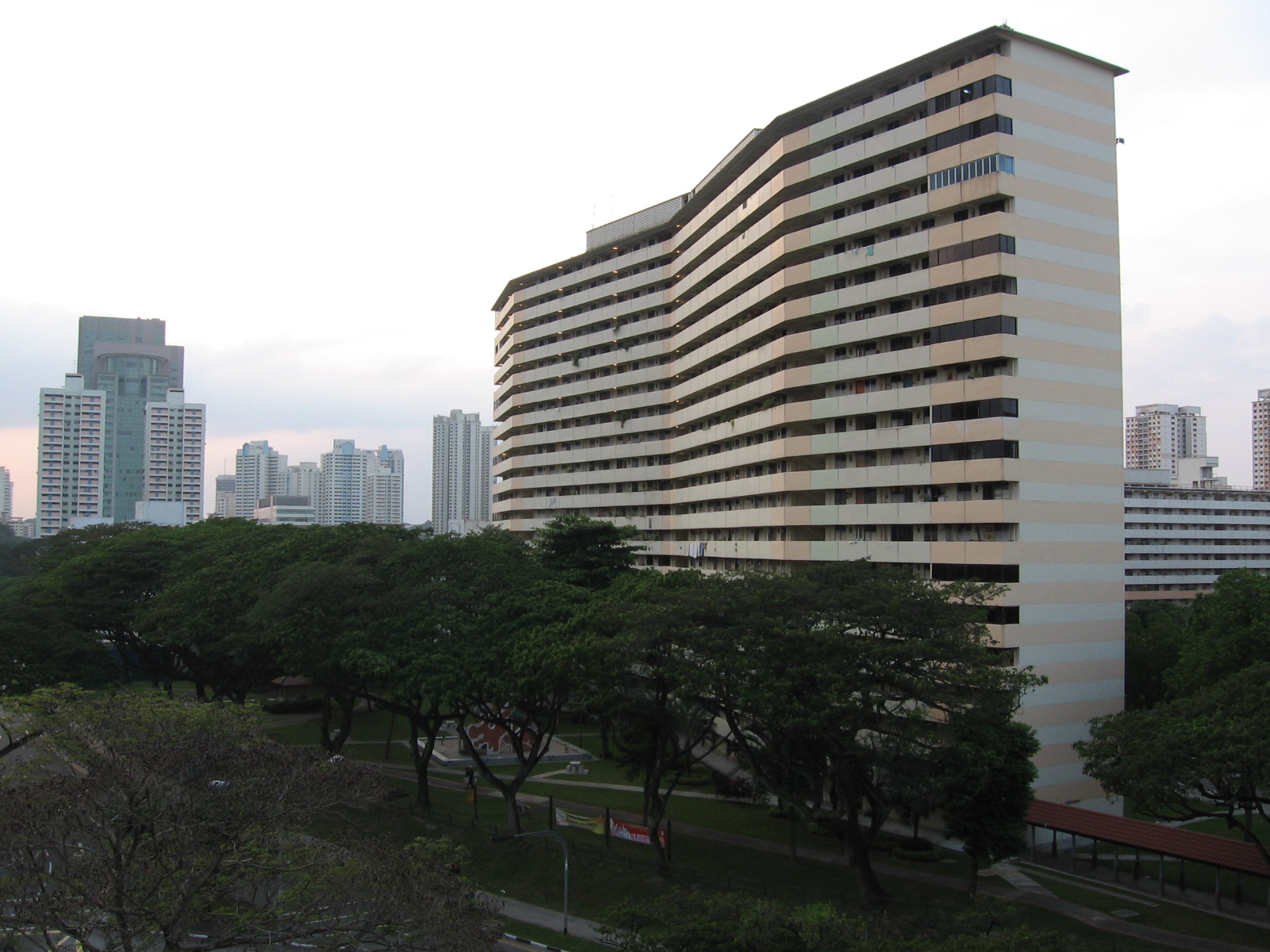
An apartment block in Toa Payoh New Town at Toa Payoh Lorong 6. The HDB Hub and point blocks at Toa Payoh Town Centre can be seen in the background. This particular block has since been en-bloc and demolished under the Selective En Bloc Redevelopment Scheme.

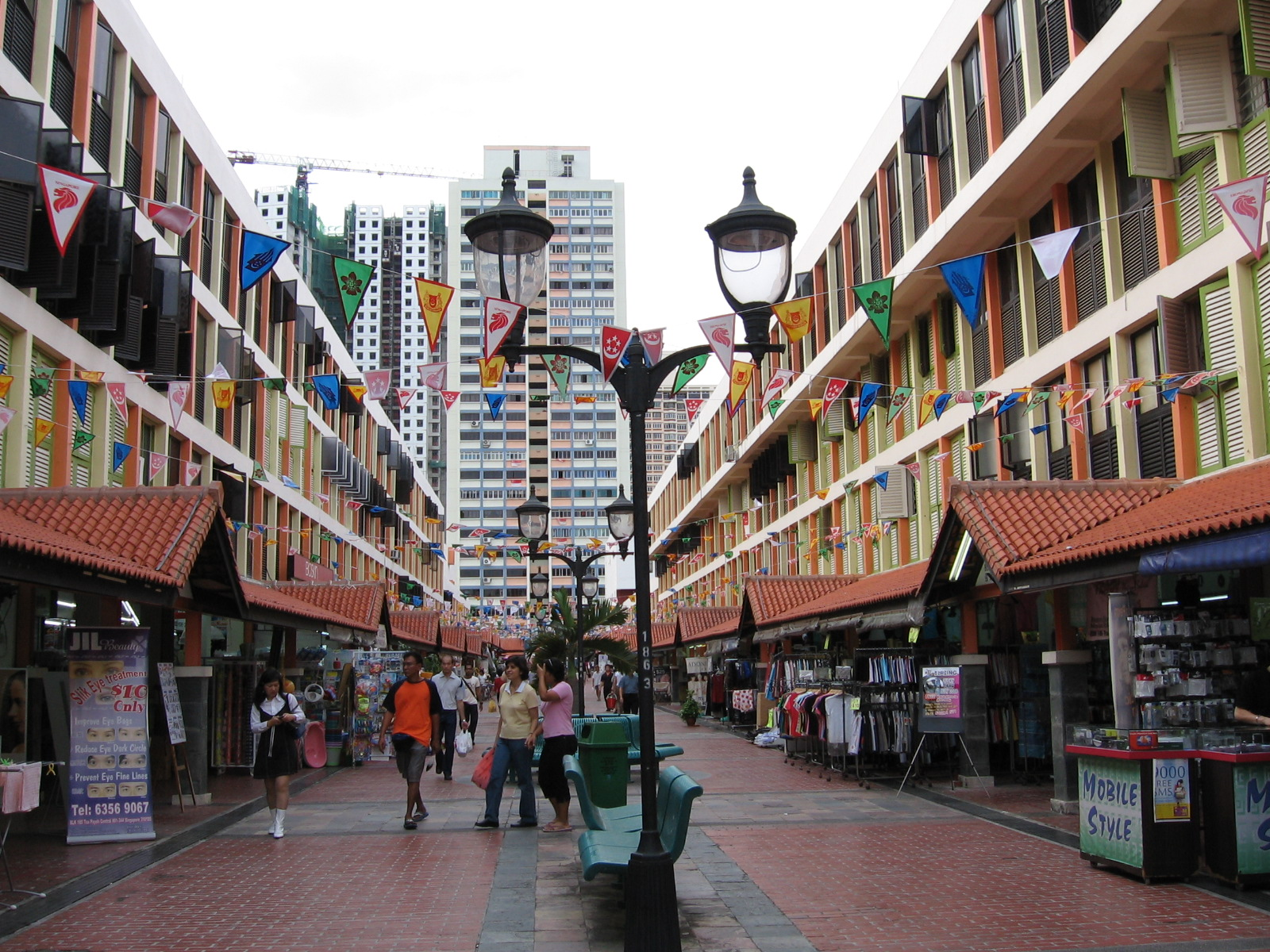
Toa Payoh Town Centre

The layout of the new town follows urban planning principles of the time. The housing estate is self-contained and has a town centre acting as a focal point for the shopping and entertainment needs of the residents.

Industrial developments were also built within the town to provide residents with job opportunities close to home while schools were built within the neighbourhoods.

=== Toa Payoh Central ===
The town centre was the first prototype in Singapore. It is surrounded by separated neighbourhoods, each with its own shopping amenities and community centres, well served by a network of vehicular roads and generous open space separating them. The result, as in the English new towns of the 1950s, is that residents tend less to travel to the main town centre but rather to shop within their neighbourhood; if they travel, they would go to the city via the MRT system, at the Toa Payoh and Braddell MRT stations, or public bus services at Toa Payoh Bus Interchange.

Nevertheless, with time, the Toa Payoh Town Centre has become increasingly popular. It has a busy atmosphere because, as with many shopping malls of the time, all commercial activities are concentrated along a single mall with high point blocks on either side and major department stores at each end. The shopping mall is actually L-shaped and there are two plazas, one with a branch library and cinema, the other with an area office and a post office. Each plaza has a department store at either end.

The commercial development, HDB Hub, located at the Toa Payoh Town Centre was completed in 2002. The Housing and Development Board relocated its headquarters from its premises at Bukit Merah to the HDB Hub on 10 June 2002. The HDB Hub comprises two wings, an atrium, four commercial building blocks, a leisure and learning centre and a three-storey basement parking lot. The building also accommodates Singapore's first fully air-conditioned Toa Payoh Bus Interchange and integrates it with the existing Toa Payoh MRT station.

Another landmark of Toa Payoh is the facility of Royal Philips Electronics (the Dutch multinational making medical and electronics equipment). Philips established an extensive facility, parts of which are now owned by Jabil and NXP. The facility has been used by Philips for developing, amongst others, televisions and DVD players for years.

An interesting landmark in Toa Payoh Central is a small tree shrine known as Ci Ern Ge Temple. This shrine goes back to the kampong days before the town was set up. It is currently managed by Toa Payoh Central Merchants’ Association (TPCMA).

=== Toa Payoh Town Park ===
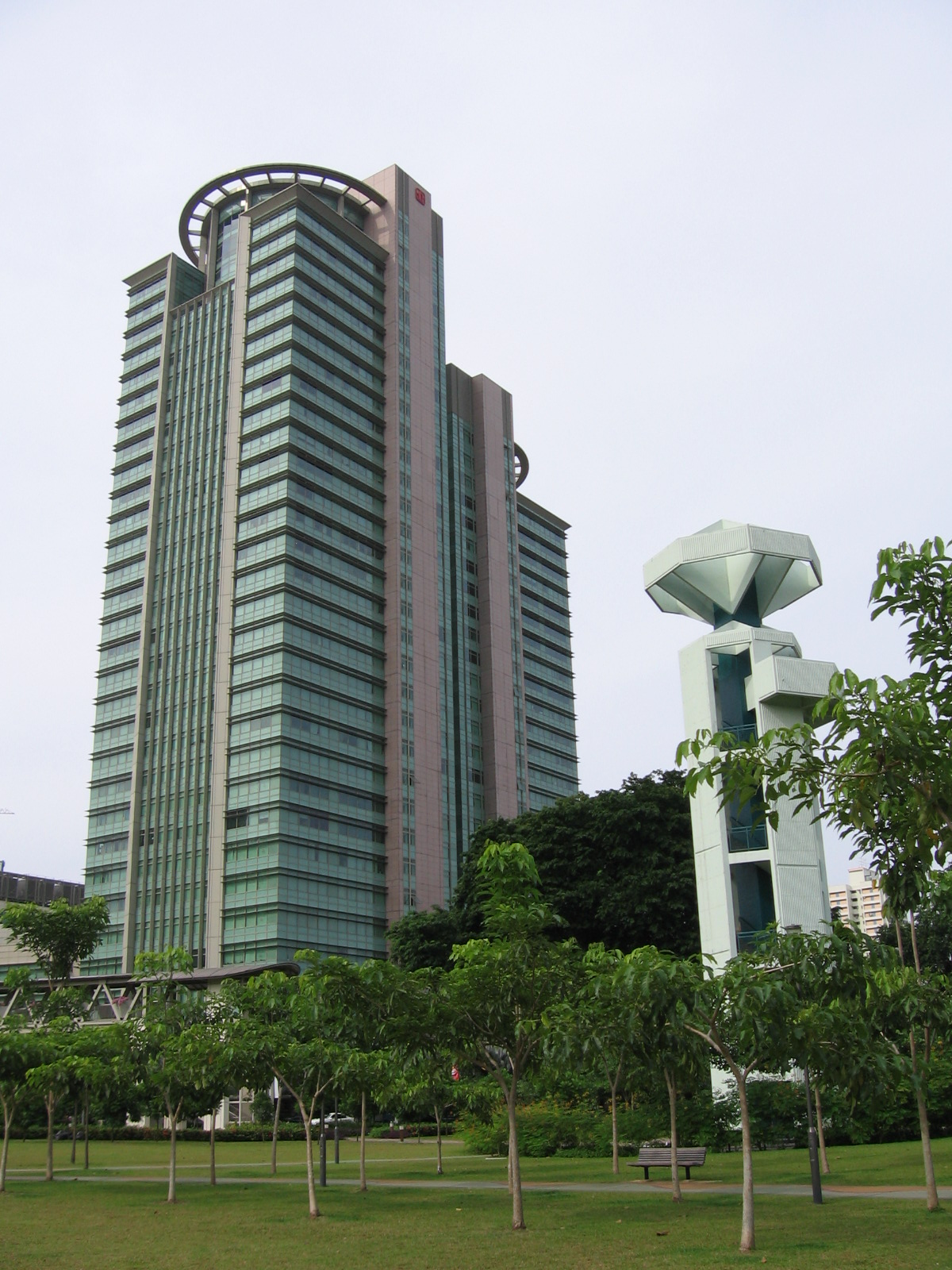
The distinctive viewing tower at Toa Payoh Town Park to the right, with the tower block of HDB Hub in the background.

The Housing and Development Board decided to allocate a large area of Toa Payoh for a garden-landscaped park, the Toa Payoh Town Garden, despite the pressure on land here for housing.

The garden contains a 0.8 ha carp pond with a waterfall and a cluster of islands linked by bridges. It features willows, bamboos, and Delonix regia trees. The garden is separated from Jalan Toa Payoh by an elevated slope planted with rows of Angsanas. Facilities include a children's playground, seating areas, an outdoor chessboard, a tea kiosk, and a 27-metre high viewing tower.

Toa Payoh Town Park was partially closed in 1999 to make way for a temporary bus interchange. After the new Toa Payoh Bus Interchange at the HDB Hub was completed in June 2002, the temporary bus interchange was converted to a landscaped park. Toa Payoh Town Garden was subsequently renamed as Toa Payoh Town Park.

=== Toa Payoh Sensory Park ===
Located along Lorong 5 Toa Payoh, the Toa Payoh Sensory Park covers an area of 1.1 ha (2.7 acres). Designed to engage visitors' senses, the park is divided into five zones based on the five senses. Designed by Surbana International and Yoshisuke Miyake, and inspired by similar parks in Japan, the park was first announced in December 2007, and was completed in October 2009 at a cost of S$3.5 million.

== Sports and recreation ==
The sporting facilities are based in the southern central part of Toa Payoh, which is located near the town centre. It includes the 3,500-seat Toa Payoh Stadium, where Singapore Premier League club Balestier Khalsa FC plays its home games. Toa Payoh Sports Hall is located besides the stadium, as well as the Singapore Table Tennis Association Academy. Meanwhile, there is also Toa Payoh Swimming Complex, where national swimming athletes train.

Besides these facilities located in the centre of the town, there are also street football courts, gym facilities and basketball courts available at various neighbourhoods of Toa Payoh. Meanwhile, SAFRA clubhouse is located besides Toa Payoh Stadium.

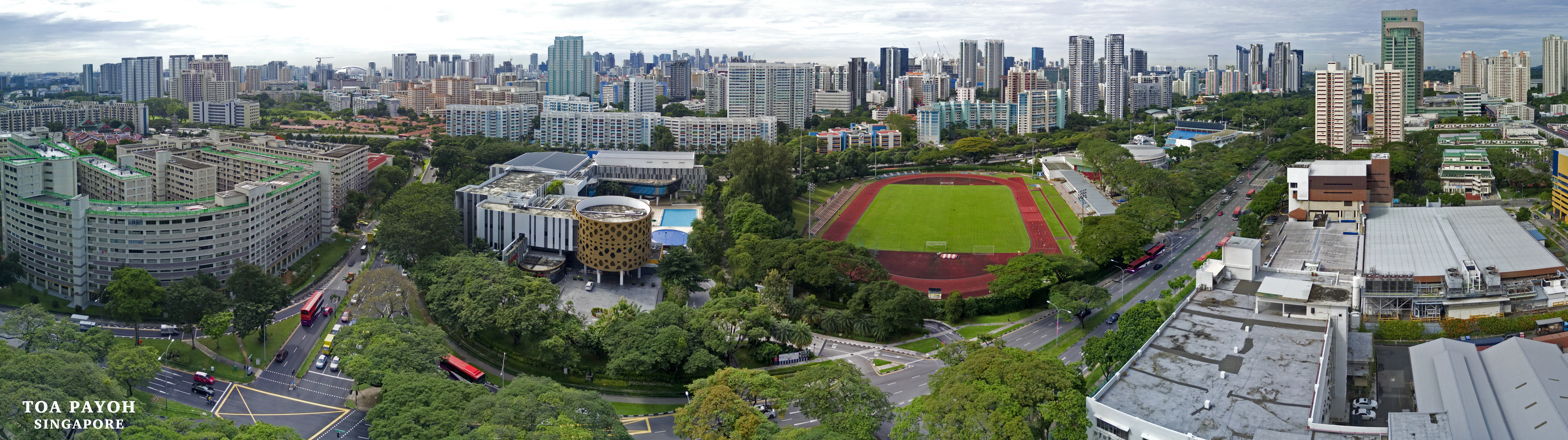
Toa Payoh aerial panorama with Toa Payoh stadium in the centre of the frame.

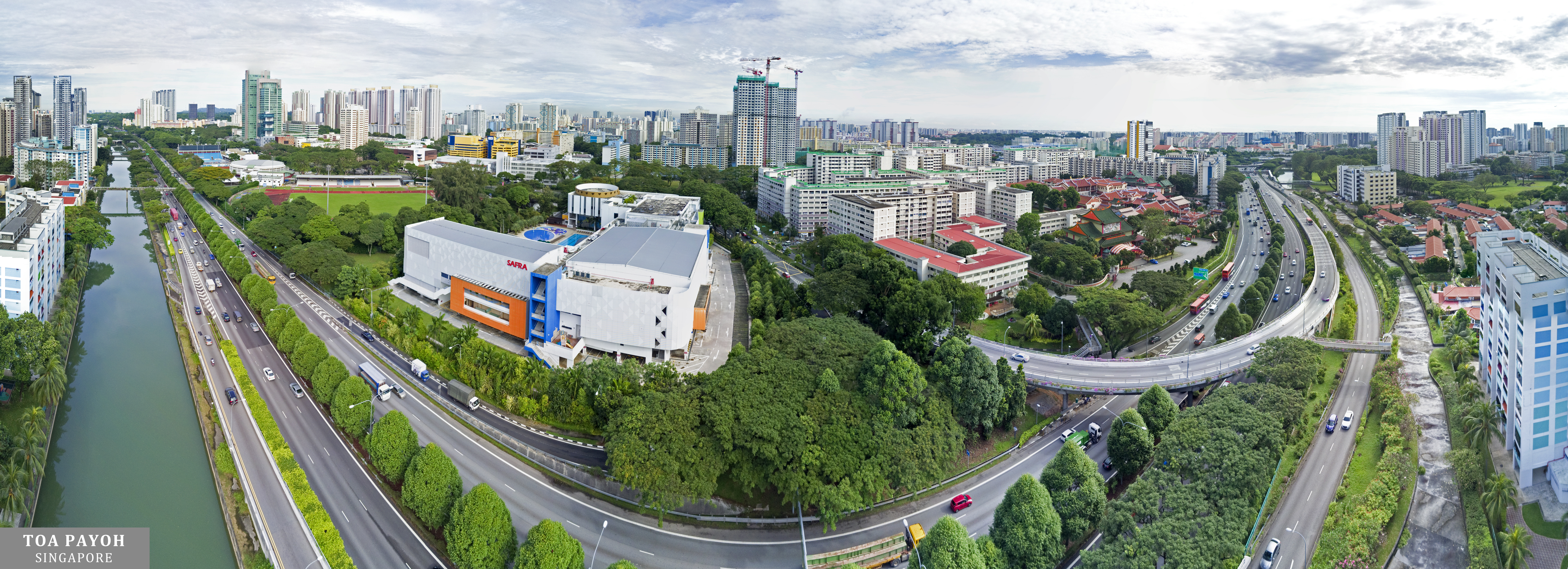
Toa Payoh aerial panorama

== Politics ==
Most of the Toa Payoh planning area is entirely located within the Bishan-Toa Payoh Group Representation Constituency, while a portion of Lorong 8 Toa Payoh was in the Potong Pasir Single Member Constituency prior to 2020. The eastern areas of Toa Payoh, which consist of the subdivisions of Bidadari and Joo Seng, now belong to both the Potong Pasir SMC and the Geylang Serai division of the Marine Parade-Braddell Heights Group Representation Constituency.

The section which is part of Bishan-Toa Payoh GRC is divided into three divisions — Toa Payoh Central, Toa Payoh East and Toa Payoh West-Thomson, which MPs are Cai Yinzhou, Saktiandi Supaat and Chee Hong Tat, respectively. The other members of parliament are Alex Yeo and Diana Pang. All five aforementioned MPs are from the People's Action Party.

== Education ==
=== Primary education ===
- Cedar Primary School
- CHIJ Primary (Toa Payoh)
- Pei Chun Public School
- Kheng Cheng School
- First Toa Payoh Primary School
- Maris Stella High School (Primary)
- Marymount Convent School
- Saint Andrew's Junior School

=== Secondary education ===
- Beatty Secondary School
- CHIJ Secondary (Toa Payoh)
- Cedar Girls' Secondary School
- Saint Andrew's Secondary School
- Saint Andrew's Junior College

=== Tertiary education ===
- Stamford American International School (University)

=== Former schools ===
- Bartley Primary School
- Cedar Boys Primary School
- Cedar Girls Primary School
- Elling Primary School

Bartley Primary School and Elling Primary School were closed and demolished, Cedar Boys with Cedar Girls Primary School were merged to Cedar Primary School.

When MacPherson Primary School also closed and demolished, MacPherson Primary School and students will joined Cedar Primary School in 2019. Cedar Primary School will simply began to build new annex block B, New annex block B completed construction in 2019.

== Transport ==
=== Road network ===
Toa Payoh Central has a circular road layout, designed to reduce direct routes through neighbourhoods.

Toa Payoh planning area is bordered by Braddell Road to the northwest, Bartley Road to the northeast, Upper Paya Lebar Road to the east, the Pan Island Expressway (PIE) to the south, and Thomson Road to the west. The Central Expressway (CTE) also runs through the median of the planning area, separating the central neighbourhood from Potong Pasir.

=== Mass Rapid Transit ===
There are six MRT stations that serve Toa Payoh planning area across four lines–North–South Line, North East Line, Circle Line, and Thomson–East Coast Line. They are:

- NS18 Braddell
- NS19 Toa Payoh
- NE10 Potong Pasir
- NE11 Woodleigh
- CC12 Bartley
- CC17 TE9 Caldecott

The under-planning Seletar Line will also run through the planning area. Details on station(s) alignment are yet to be finalised.

=== Bus ===
The current Toa Payoh Bus Interchange opened in May 2002 as the first air-conditioned bus interchange and Integrated Transport Hub (ITH) in the country. Woodleigh Bus Interchange and ITH opened in 20 April 2025.

=== Cycling ===
Toa Payoh New Town has around 10.8 km (6.7 mi) of cycling paths, completed in October 2025. This is in addition to the existing park connector (PC) running along Kallang River towards Bishan to the north and Marina Bay to the south.

Another 7.7 km (4.8 mi) of cycling paths are being built in phases since 2024 in the eastern subzones of Woodleigh, Potong Pasir, Bidadari, Sennett and Joo Seng, which will be completed by 2030. The first phase, involving 2.7 km (1.7 mi) of cycling paths, will be completed by end-2025.

A planned PC running along the southern edge of Toa Payoh New Town towards Caldecott MRT station will connect the town to MacRitchie Reservoir.

== Notable locations ==
- 53 Lorong 5 Toa Payoh, also known as VIP block, a notable HDB flat

== Popular culture ==
TV shows

- Home in Toa Payoh on MediaCorp Channel 8

== Bibliography ==
- Toa Payoh: Our Kind Of Neighbourhood by Koh, Buck Song, a coffeetable corporate history of the Housing and Development Board and of 40 years of public housing, told through the stories of five families in Toa Payoh. Times Editions, Singapore, 2000. ISBN 981-232-124-1.
- "A Brief History of Toa Payoh" by Koh, Buck Song, published in the verse anthology "A Brief History of Toa Payoh And Other Poems", Imperial Publishing House, Singapore, 1992, and on the website of Bishan-Toa Payoh Town Council at https://www.btptc.org.sg/AboutUs/OurHistory
- "Toa Payoh Reborn" by Koh, Buck Song, in the Cultural Medallion project coffee table book Heartlands: Home And Nation In The Art Of Ong Kim Seng, Singapore 2008.
