= Seah Kian Peng =

Singaporean politician

The Honourable Seah Kian Peng
- 谢健平
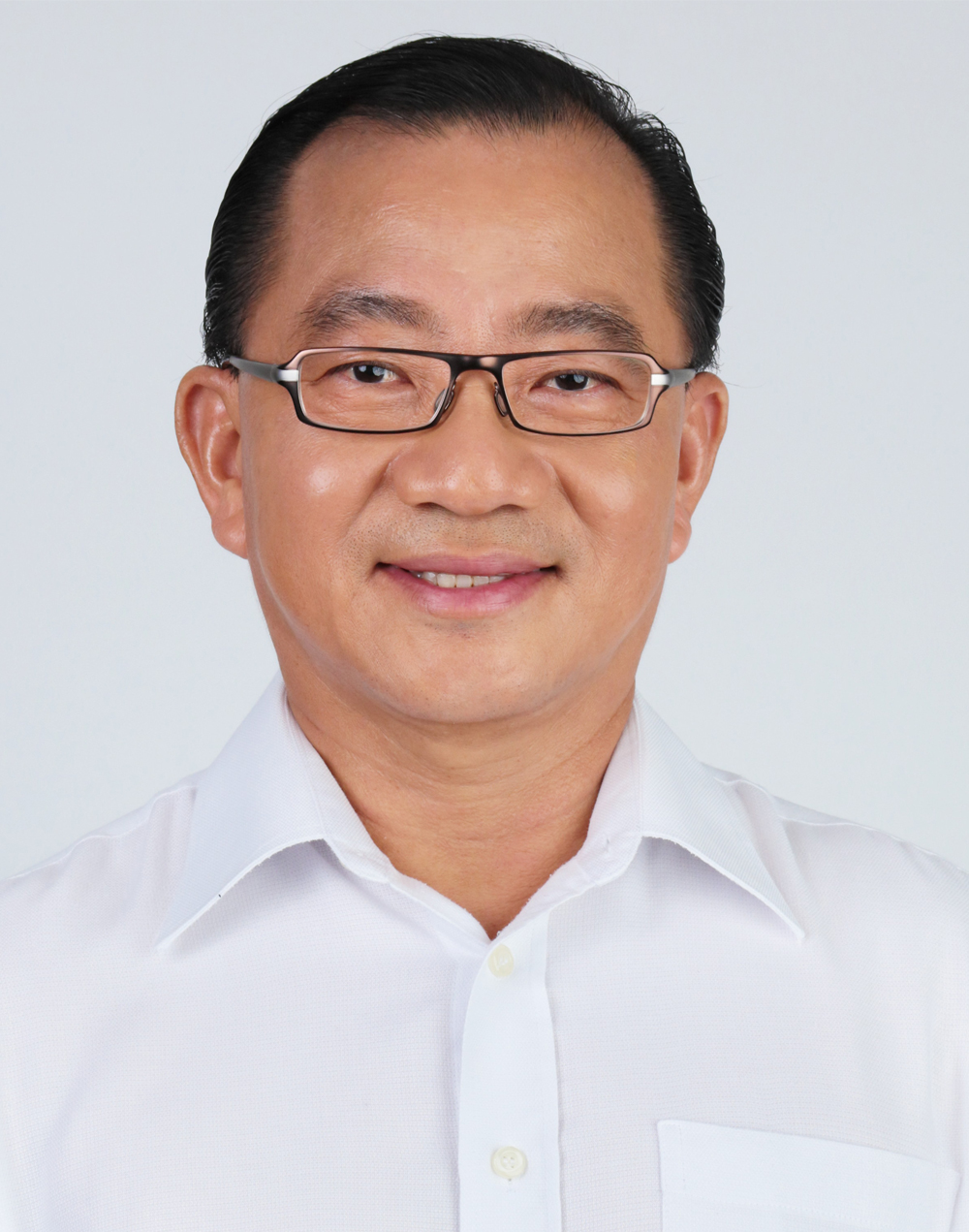
- Official portrait, 2021

Speaker of the Parliament of Singapore
- Incumbent
- Assumed office 2 August 2023
- Prime Minister: Lee Hsien Loong; Lawrence Wong
- Deputy: Christopher de Souza; Jessica Tan; Xie Yao Quan
- Preceded by: Tan Chuan-Jin; Jessica Tan (Acting)

Deputy Speaker of the Parliament of Singapore
- In office 17 October 2011 – 14 January 2016 Serving with Charles Chong (2011–2020)
- Prime Minister: Lee Hsien Loong
- Speaker: Michael Palmer (2011–2012); Halimah Yacob (2013–2017)
- Preceded by: Matthias Yao
- Succeeded by: Lim Biow Chuan

Member of the Singapore Parliament for Marine Parade–Braddell Heights GRC
- Incumbent
- Assumed office 23 April 2025
- Preceded by: Constituency established
- Majority: N/A (walkover)

Member of the Singapore Parliament for Marine Parade GRC
- In office 27 April 2006 – 15 April 2025
- Preceded by: PAP held
- Succeeded by: Constituency abolished
- Majority: 2006: N/A (walkover); 2011: 18,360 (13.30%); 2015: 37,385 (28.14%); 2020: 20,156 (15.48%)

Personal details
- Born: 5 December 1961 (age 64) Colony of Singapore
- Party: People's Action Party
- Spouse: Jean Yap
- Children: 2
- Education: University of New South Wales

Seah Kian Peng (Note: Chinese: 谢健平; Pe̍h-ōe-jī: Siā Kiān-pêng) (born 5 December 1961) is a Singaporean politician who has been serving as Speaker of the Parliament of Singapore since 2023. He served as Deputy Speaker of the Parliament of Singapore between 2011 and 2016. A member of the governing People's Action Party (PAP), he has been the Member of Parliament (MP) for the Braddell Heights division of Marine Parade–Braddell Heights Group Representation Constituency (GRC) since 2025. He had previously represented the same division in Marine Parade GRC between 2006 and 2025.

== Early life ==
Seah was born into a family of six. His father was a line worker in a printing firm, and his mother was a homemaker who took on sewing gigs to supplement the family income. He is the third of four children. Seah studied at Raffles Institution before he received a Colombo Plan scholarship to study at the University of New South Wales.

== Career ==
=== Early career ===
Upon graduation with a first class honours degree in building, Seah returned to Singapore to complete his National Service, then worked in a government-linked company, Indeco Engineers, before joining the Singapore Civil Service. Seah was seconded to the National Trades Union Congress (NTUC) to do corporate planning and start NTUC Healthcare's chain of pharmacies. Seah then left NTUC for piling and engineering firm Sum Cheong Corporation between 1994 and 1996. He returned to the public sector in 1996 to head NTUC Healthcare and NTUC Media successively, before being appointed as the chief operating officer of NTUC FairPrice in 2001, then as the chief executive officer of NTUC FairPrice in 2010.

=== Political career ===
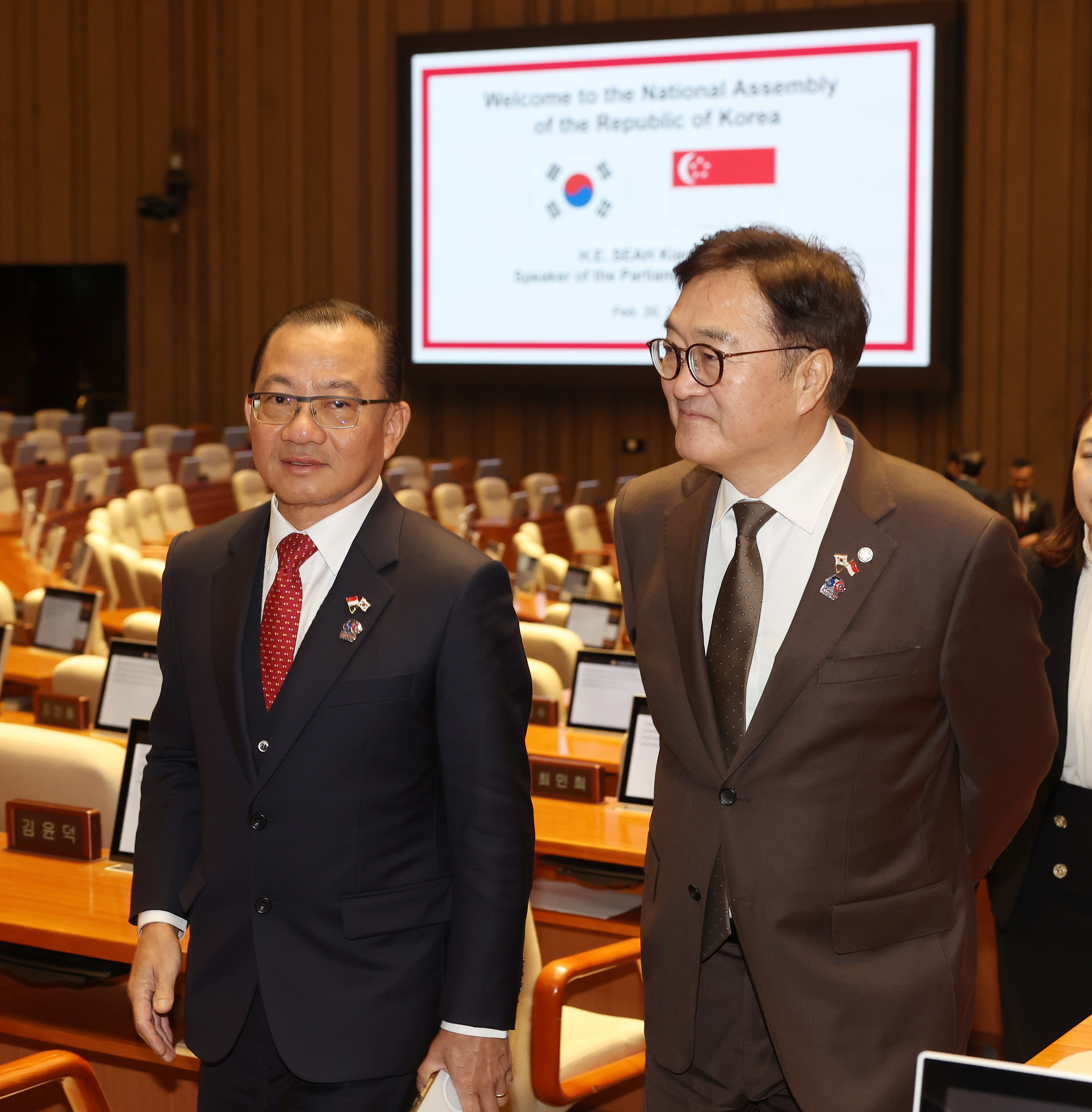
Seah and Speaker of the National Assembly of South Korea Woo Won-shik, February 2025, Seoul

Seah was fielded as a candidate of a PAP team for Marine Parade GRC in the 2006 general election, and was elected as Member of Parliament for Marine Parade GRC in a walkover for the 11th Parliament. Seah was re-elected in Marine Parade Group GRC in the 2011, 2015 and 2020 general elections when the PAP team was challenged by the National Solidarity Party and Workers' Party respectively.

In Parliament, Seah served as Deputy Speaker from October 2011 to January 2016. On 10 March 2010, Vivian Balakrishnan, Minister for Community Development, Youth and Sports, suggested that Seah to work out a private member's bill to propose amendments to the Maintenance of Parents Act. After establishing a 10-person workgroup to look at the proposal, the bill was introduced on 18 October 2010 and was passed on 23 November 2010.

Seah was appointed as CEO of NTUC Fairprice from 2010 to 2022 and as chairperson of Social and Family Development Government Parliamentary Committee (GPC) in the 14th Parliament.

In October 2011, Seah was co-opted to the PAP's 31st Central Executive Committee as a member and held that position until December 2012.

In April 2020, Seah attracted controversy during the COVID-19 pandemic, when he spoke to residents at coffee shops and at a wet market. Seah later claimed he "played the role of a safe distancing ambassador" during the government-imposed "circuit breaker" lockdown. Seah has served as the Vice-Chairman of the Marine Parade–Braddell Heights Batok Town Council since 2025.

==== Speaker of Parliament (2023-present) ====
On 21 July 2023, it was announced that Seah will be nominated to be the next Speaker of Parliament by Prime Minister Lee Hsien Loong after the resignation of Tan Chuan-Jin due to his extra-marital affair. Seah was elected as Speaker on 2 August 2023. In his first speech after his election as Speaker, he urged that all members of the parliament must be vigilant in personal conduct and serve the people.

On 23 April 2025, Seah was fielded with Tin Pei Ling, Faishal Ibrahim, and new faces Diana Pang and Goh Pei Ming to contest at Marine Parade–Braddell Heights Group Representation Constituency and became the lead anchor for Marine Parade–Braddell Heights GRC in the 2025 Singaporean general election replacing former anchor lead Tan See Leng. As there was no opposition to the team's candidacy, a walkover was declared on the Nomination Day on 23 April 2025. On 20 June 2025, Seah was renominated by Prime Minister Lawrence Wong as House Speaker.

On 18 September 2026, Seah apologized for nodding off during a parliamentary debate on 9 September. Seah said he was feeling unwell and had taken medication but it should not be an excuse for his conduct.

== Personal life ==
Seah is married to Jean Yap and they have two children.

== Notes ==
Parliament of Singapore
Preceded by R Ravindran; Othman Haron Eusofe; Mohamad Maidin bin Packer Mohd; Goh Chok Tong; Andy Gan Lai Chiang; Lim Hwee Hua	Member of Parliament for Marine Parade GRC; 2006–2025; Served alongside: (2006–2011): Fatimah Lateef, Muhammad Faishal Ibrahim, Ong Seh Hong, Goh Chok Tong, Lim Biow Chuan (2011–2015): Fatimah Lateef, Tan Chuan-Jin, Tin Pei Ling, Goh Chok Tong (2015–2020): Fatimah Lateef, Edwin Tong, Tan Chuan-Jin, Goh Chok Tong (2020–2025): Fahmi Aliman, Edwin Tong, Tan Chuan-Jin, Tan See Leng	Constituency abolished
New constituency	Member of Parliament for Marine Parade–Braddell Heights GRC; 2025–present Served alongside: (2025–present): Diana Pang, Muhammad Faishal Ibrahim, Tin Pei Ling, Goh Pei Ming	Incumbent
Preceded by Matthias Yao Chih	Deputy Speaker of Parliament; 2011 – 2016	Succeeded by Lim Biow Chuan
Preceded by Tan Chuan-Jin	Speaker of the Parliament of Singapore; 2023 – present	Incumbent
