= Goh Pei Ming =

Singaporean politician

The Honourable Goh Pei Ming
- 吴培铭

Member of the Singapore Parliament for Marine Parade–Braddell Heights GRC
- Incumbent
- Assumed office 23 April 2025
- Preceded by: Constituency established
- Majority: N/A (walkover)

Personal details
- Born: 1982 (age 43–44) Singapore
- Party: People's Action Party
- Children: 3
- Education: Cornell University (BEng); Stanford University (MS); King's College London (MA)

Military service
- Allegiance: Singapore
- Branch/service: Singapore Army
- Years of service: 2001–2025
- Rank: Brigadier-General
- Commands: Chief of Staff - Joint Staff; Director of Joint Operations; Head, Joint Plans and Transformation Department; Commander, 3rd Division

Goh Pei Ming (Note: Chinese: 吴培铭; pinyin: Wú Péimíng) (born 1982) is a Singaporean politician who has been serving as Senior Minister of State for Social and Family Development, and Senior Minister of State for Home Affairs since 27 July 2026. A member of the ruling People's Action Party (PAP), he is a Member of Parliament representing Marine Parade–Braddell Heights Group Representation Constituency (GRC) for the 15th Parliament of Singapore after a walkover was declared for the constituency in the 2025 Singaporean general election. Goh represents the division of Marine Parade in his constituency, taking over from Manpower Minister Tan See Leng who was moved to Chua Chu Kang GRC.

== Education ==
Goh received his early education at Fengshan Primary School. He subsequently attended Dunman High School and Victoria Junior College where he was awarded the Wong Hung Khim trophy, VJC's highest award. He was a President Scout. After junior college, he was awarded the Singapore Armed Forces (SAF) Overseas Scholarship and obtained a bachelor’s degree (summa cum laude) in Civil Engineering from Cornell University, followed by a master's degree in Defence Studies from King's College London and a master's degree in Management Science and Engineering from Stanford University.

== Career ==
Goh also served on various Board appointments. He was a member of the Board of Governors for Temasek Polytechnic from 2020-2023, Defence Science and Technology Agency (DSTA) from 2024-2025, DSO National Laboratories from 2024-2025 and Defence Collective Singapore from 2024-2025. He also served on the Advisory Panel for REACH, the Government's feedback unit, from 2022-2024.

=== Military career ===
Upon completion of his studies, Goh returned to Singapore Armed Forces to serve in the Army as an Infantry officer. In 2010, shortly after his wedding, Goh was deployed to Kandahar, Afghanistan for seven months, attached to a US division overseeing deployments, intelligence updates and risk assessments in the area. He attended the Joint Services Command and Staff College in the UK and was awarded the Top International Student.

Throughout his military career, Goh held several key appointments such as the Director of Joint Operations (DJO), Commander 3rd Singapore Division and the Head of Joint Plans and Transformation Department (JPTD). He previously also commanded the 3rd Singapore Infantry Brigade (3 SIB) and the 3rd Battalion, Singapore Infantry Regiment (3 SIR). He has also served as the Army Attaché in the Singapore Embassy based in Jakarta, Indonesia.

He chaired the National Day Parade (NDP) organising committee in 2022, the first full scale NDP after the COVID-19 safe distancing measures were first implemented in 2020. During the COVID-19 pandemic in 2020, he was involved in the SAF's effort to manage the outbreak in the foreign workers dormitories, for which he was awarded the Public Administration Medal (Silver) (COVID-19). On 1 July 2021, Goh was promoted as Brigadier-General. Before he left the Army on 31 March 2025, he was the Chief of Staff - Joint Staff, assisting the Chief of Defence Force to oversee and implement a plethora of organisation-wide plans and initiatives. He was concurrently the SAF Inspector-General and MINDEF Chief Sustainability Officer.

=== Political career ===
Goh last served as the chairman of the Kampong Chai Chee Community Club Management Committee and concurrently as the Vice-Chairman of the Kampong Chai Chee Citizens’ Consultative Committee.

After he left the Singapore Armed Forces, he joined the People's Action Party on 1 April 2025. Goh was spotted in walkabouts in East Coast GRC and Punggol GRC before he was eventually fielded with Tin Pei Ling, Diana Pang, Faishal Ibrahim, and Seah Kian Peng to contest at Marine Parade–Braddell Heights Group Representation Constituency in the 2025 Singaporean general election, replacing former anchor minister Tan See Leng who left the GRC to helm Chua Chu Kang GRC replacing Gan Kim Yong who was sent to helm Punggol GRC. As there was no opposition to the team's candidacy after the Workers' Party pulled out, a walkover was declared on Nomination Day on 23 April 2025. As such, Goh would be serving as a Member of Parliament for Marine Parade–Braddell Heights GRC representing the Marine Parade division in the 15th Parliament of Singapore after the General Election on 3 May 2025.

Goh was appointed as Minister of State of Home Affairs and Social and Family Development in the Second Lawrence Wong Cabinet following the 2025 general elections.

Prime Minister Lawrence Wong promoted him to be Senior Minister of State in the Ministry of Home Affairs and the Ministry of Social and Family Development effective 27 July 2026.

== Personal life ==
Goh married his primary school classmate in 2009. Together, they have three children.

== Notes ==
New constituency	Member of Parliament for Marine Parade–Braddell Heights GRC; 2025–present Served alongside: (2025–present): Muhammad Faishal Ibrahim, Tin Pei Ling, Diana Pang	Incumbent
