= Jeannette Chong-Aruldoss =

Singaporean lawyer and politician

- 张媛容
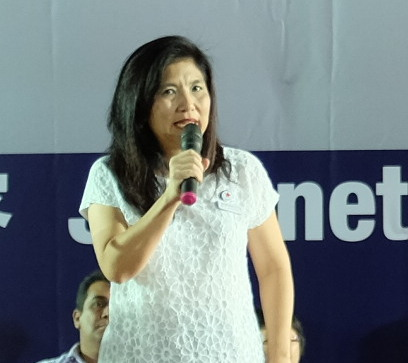
- Chong-Aruldoss in 2015

4th Secretary-General of the National Solidarity Party
- In office 27 October 2013 – 25 January 2015
- Preceded by: Hazel Poa
- Succeeded by: Lim Tean

Vice-President of the National Solidarity Party
- In office 24 June 2011 – 27 October 2013
- Preceded by: Christopher Neo
- Succeeded by: Yip Yew Weng

Personal details
- Born: Jeannette Florina Chong Yean Yoong; 27 May 1963 (age 63) Singapore
- Other political affiliations: Reform Party (2009–2011); National Solidarity Party (2011–2015); Singapore People's Party (2015–2019)
- Spouse: James Aruldoss
- Children: 4
- Education: Bachelor of Laws, Master of Laws
- Alma mater: University of Kent at Canterbury, London School of Economics
- Occupation: Lawyer, Politician

Jeannette Florina Chong-Aruldoss Yean Yoong (Note: Chinese: 张媛容; Pha̍k-fa-sṳ: Chông Yen-yùng. In this Chinese name, the family name is Chong-Aruldoss. In accordance with custom, the Western-style name is Jeannette-Florina Aruldoss and the Chinese-style name is Chong Yean Yoong.) (born 27 May 1963) is a Singaporean lawyer and politician. She started her political career by joining the Reform Party (RP) in 2009. In 2011, she left RP to join the National Solidarity Party (NSP) where she served as the NSP's secretary-general from October 2013 to January 2015. In April 2015, Chong-Aruldoss left NSP, after a failed leadership challenge, to join the Singapore People's Party (SPP) which she left in 2019.

== Education ==
Chong-Aruldoss was educated at CHIJ Katong Convent before she read law at the University of Kent at Canterbury and completed a Bachelor of Laws (honours) in 1985. In 1987, she completed a Master of Laws in corporate and commercial law at the London School of Economics.

== Legal career ==
Chong-Aruldoss qualified as a barrister-at-law at Gray's Inn in 1986 and became an advocate and solicitor in Singapore in 1989. She began her legal career at Allen & Gledhill LLP. In 2001, she co-founded Archilex Law Corporation, a founding member of Mozaic Group Law Practice. She is currently a consultant at Robert Wang & Woo LLP and an accredited mediator at the Singapore Mediation Centre.

== Political career ==
=== Reform Party ===
Chong-Aruldoss entered politics in 2009 and eventually became a member of the Reform Party's central executive committee. She left the Reform Party on 18 February 2011 due to "differences of opinion".

=== National Solidarity Party ===
In 2011, Chong-Aruldoss joined the National Solidarity Party (NSP), and stood for election as a NSP candidate during the general election that year in Mountbatten SMC. However, she lost to Lim Biow Chuan, the candidate from the governing People's Action Party (PAP), after getting 41.38% of the vote against Lim's 58.62%.

On 27 October 2013, Chong-Aruldoss was elected the secretary-general of the NSP following the resignation of her predecessor, Hazel Poa.

In January 2015, Chong-Aruldoss challenged Sebastian Teo for the position of president of the NSP but was voted out of the NSP's central executive committee.

=== Singapore People's Party ===
Chong-Aruldoss eventually left the NSP and joined the Singapore People's Party (SPP) in April 2015. In the general election that year, she contested as a SPP candidate in Mountbatten SMC, but lost to the PAP's Lim again, garnering just 28.14% of the vote against Lim's 71.86%.

=== Leaving the Singapore People's Party ===
On 2 September 2019, Chong-Aruldoss resigned from the SPP. In a Facebook post announcing her resignation, she said, "I entered politics in 2009 because I was convinced that the PAP held too much power and I was worried for Singaporeans. I felt that we desperately needed more opposition in Parliament to redress the imbalance." Two days later, she told The Independent Singapore in an interview that she had no plans to join another political party.

In October 2019, Chong-Aruldoss was seen accompanying Workers' Party members on a walkabout in the Eunos Crescent area of Marine Parade GRC.

In 2021, Chong-Aruldoss wrote an article on Medium encouraging Singaporeans to get vaccinated for COVID-19.

== Personal life ==
She is married to James Martin Aruldoss and they have four children.

On 8 August 2017, Chong-Aruldoss sustained a bruised hip after she was assaulted by fellow lawyer and politician M Ravi at The Adelphi. Court documents revealed that Ravi had gone to The Adelphi and demanded to be allowed inside Eugene Thuraisingam's law firm, where Chong-Aruldoss was working then. He had stopped her abruptly and began questioning her aggressively. When she tried to walk away, he forcefully pushed her twice, causing her to stumble backwards and fall onto the ground. After she was down, he kicked and flung her belongings scattered on the ground, and also threw a shoe in her direction while mocking her for being 'drama'. On 5 January 2018, in lieu of a jail term, Ravi was ordered to undergo an 18-month mandatory treatment for his bipolar disorder, which had led to him committing the offence, among others.
