= 53 Lorong 5 Toa Payoh =

Housing and Development block in Toa Payoh, Singapore

Coordinates: 1.3377°N 103.8486°E

Block 53 Lorong 5 Toa Payoh, also known as the VIP Block, is a HDB block in Toa Payoh, Singapore. The building is the only block in Toa Payoh with a Y-shaped design.

== History ==
Constructed sometime before 1968, Block 53, located along Lorong 5 Toa Payoh, is the only block in the town of Toa Payoh with the unique Y-shape design. The building is 19-stories tall, and has a rooftop gallery which is inaccessible to the public. The building has been the site of at least four deaths due to falling between 1971 and 1978, two of which occurred within the same week.

The building was visited by Queen Elizabeth II on her visit to Singapore, when she was visiting Toa Payoh in 1972. The building was also visited by General Bulsak Wanamas, the former under-secretary of defense of Thailand, during his visit to Singapore in 1973. The building has also been visited by John Gorton, Princess Anne, Prince Philip, Benjamin Sheares, and Sirimavo Bandaranaike. The building is included in the Toa Payoh Heritage Trail by the National Heritage Board.
