= Mountbatten Single Member Constituency =

Electoral division in Singapore

Coordinates: 1.295°N 103.88°E

Mountbatten
- Single-member constituency for the Parliament of Singapore
- Region: Central Region, Singapore
- Electorate: 22,843

Current constituency
- Created: 2011; 15 years ago
- Seats: 1
- Party: People's Action Party
- Member: Gho Sze Kee
- Town Council: Marine Parade–Braddell Heights
- Reformed from: Marine Parade GRC (2011)

The Mountbatten Single Member Constituency (Note: Malay: Kawasan Undi Perseorangan Mountbatten; Chinese: 蒙巴登单选区; Tamil: மவுண்ட்பேட்டன் தனித்தொகுதி) is a single-member constituency (SMC) situated in central Singapore. Recreated in 2011 after having been merged in 1997, it is managed by Marine Parade–Braddell Heights Town Council (MPBHTC). The current Member of Parliament (MP) for the constituency is Gho Sze Kee from the People's Action Party (PAP).

The constituency had previously existed as Mountbatten Constituency from 1959 to 1988, before being renamed Mountbatten Single Member Constituency from 1988 to 1991. In 1991, it was merged into Marine Parade Group Representation Constituency (GRC) in the 1991 general election.

== History ==
Mountbatten Constituency was established for the 1959 general election and was renamed Mountbatten SMC in 1988. It was then abolished in 1997. From 1991 to 2011, Mountbatten SMC did not exist.

Prior to the 2011 general election, Mountbatten SMC was reformed from the division of the same name in Marine Parade GRC. Lim Biow Chuan, the incumbent MP for the division, contested the SMC, defeating Jeanette Chong-Aruldoss from the National Solidarity Party (NSP) with 58.62% of the vote.

For the 2015 general election, Chong-Aruldoss switched to the Singapore People's Party (SPP) and recontested the constituency; Lim defeated her in a rematch with an improved 71.86% of the vote.

For the 2020 general election, Lim stood for reelection in Mountbatten SMC; he defeated Peoples Voice (PV) newcomer Sivakumaran Chellappa with an improved 73.82% of the vote despite a national swing against the PAP.

Interactive map of Mountbatten SMC as of the 2025 general election

Prior to the 2025 general election, a polling district was moved from Mountbatten SMC to the newly created Marine Parade–Braddell Heights GRC. PAP announced that Lim would retire from politics; Gho, a political newcomer, replaced him as the PAP candidate for the SMC. She defeated independent candidate and Bitcoin investor Jeremy Tan with 63.82% of the vote, a negative swing of 10% from 2020.

== Member of Parliament ==
Year	Member	Party
Formation
Legislative Assembly of Singapore
1959	Seow Peck Leng	SPA
1963	Ng Yeow Chong	PAP
Parliament of Singapore
1968	Ng Yeow Chong	PAP
1972	Ng Yeow Chong	PAP
1976	Ng Yeow Chong	PAP
1980	Eugene Yap Giau Cheng	PAP
1984	Eugene Yap Giau Cheng	PAP
1988	Eugene Yap Giau Cheng	PAP
1991	Eugene Yap Giau Cheng	PAP
Constituency abolished (1997 – 2011)
2011	Lim Biow Chuan	PAP
2015	Lim Biow Chuan	PAP
2020	Lim Biow Chuan	PAP
2025	Gho Sze Kee	PAP

== Electoral results ==
Note: The Elections Department does not include rejected votes when calculating the vote shares of candidates. Hence, all candidates' vote shares will total to 100% at any given election (may not appear so in multi-way contests due to rounding).

=== Elections in 1950s ===
General Election 1959
Party	Candidate	Votes	%
SPA	Seow Peck Leng	3,031	33.71
PAP	Tay Kim Sun	2,143	23.84
MCA	Wong Foo Nam	1,903	21.17
KURA	Felice Leon-Soh	1,354	15.06
LSP	Wee Soo Bee	559	6.22
Majority		888	9.87
Total valid votes		8,990	99.28
Rejected ballots		65	0.72
Turnout		9,055	88.67
Registered electors		10,212	
SPA win (new seat)			

=== Elections in 1960s ===
General Election 1963
Party	Candidate	Votes	%	±%
PAP	Ng Yeow Chong	7,751	48.97	▲25.13
BS	Fung Yin Ching	5,158	32.59	N/A
SA	Lee Kim Chuan	1,865	11.78	▼21.93
Independent	Felice Leon-Soh	1,053	6.66	▼8.40
Majority		2,593	16.38	▲6.51
Total valid votes		15,827	99.11	▼0.17
Rejected ballots		142	0.89	▲0.17
Turnout		15,969	94.81	▲6.14
Registered electors		16,843		▲64.93
PAP gain from SPA		Swing	▲25.13	

Notes: the incumbent Singapore People's Alliance (SPA) had joined the UMNO-MCA-MIC alliance to form the Singapore Alliance Party (SA) in this election.

General Election 1968
Party	Candidate	Votes	%	±%
PAP	Ng Yeow Chong	Unopposed		
Registered electors		12,760		▼24.24
PAP hold				

=== Elections in 1970s ===
General Election 1972
Party	Candidate	Votes	%	±%
PAP	Ng Yeow Chong	Unopposed		
Registered electors		14,396		▲12.82
PAP hold				

General Election 1976
Party	Candidate	Votes	%	±%
PAP	Ng Yeow Chong	9,412	65.86	N/A
UF	Seow Khee Leng	4,878	34.14	N/A
Majority		4,534	31.72	N/A
Total valid votes		14,290	97.16	N/A
Rejected ballots		417	2.84	N/A
Turnout		14,707	95.25	N/A
Registered electors		15,440		▲7.25
PAP hold				

=== Elections in 1980s ===
General Election 1980
Party	Candidate	Votes	%	±%
PAP	Eugene Yap Giau Cheng	Unopposed		
Registered electors		14,045		▼9.03
PAP hold				

General Election 1984
Party	Candidate	Votes	%	±%
PAP	Eugene Yap Giau Cheng	16,077	81.32	N/A
Independent	Tan Ah Teng	3,692	18.68	N/A
Majority		12,385	62.64	N/A
Total valid votes		19,769	96.41	N/A
Rejected ballots		736	3.59	N/A
Turnout		20,505	95.46	N/A
Registered electors		21,480		▲52.94
PAP hold		Swing	N/A	

General Election 1988
Party	Candidate	Votes	%	±%
PAP	Eugene Yap Giau Cheng	12,712	78.15	▼3.17
Independent	Chiam Pan Boon	3,554	21.85	▲3.17
Majority		9,158	56.30	▼6.34
Total valid votes		16,266	96.20	▼0.21
Rejected ballots		643	3.80	▲0.21
Turnout		16,909	95.28	▼0.18
Registered electors		17,747		▼17.38
PAP hold		Swing	▼3.17	

=== Elections in 1990s ===
General Election 1991
Party	Candidate	Votes	%	±%
PAP	Eugene Yap Giau Cheng	11,029	77.95	▼0.20
Independent	Yen Kim Khooi	3,119	22.05	▲0.20
Majority		7,910	55.90	▼0.40
Total valid votes		14,148	95.98	▼0.22
Rejected ballots		593	4.02	▲0.22
Turnout		14,741	95.12	▼0.16
Registered electors		15,497		▼12.68
PAP hold		Swing	▼0.2	

=== Elections in 2010s ===
General Election 2011
Party	Candidate	Votes	%
PAP	Lim Biow Chuan	11,985	58.62
NSP	Jeannette Chong-Aruldoss	8,461	41.38
Majority		3,524	17.24
Total valid votes		20,446	98.00
Rejected ballots		419	2.00
Turnout		20,865	87.92
Registered electors		23,731	
PAP win (new seat)			

General Election 2015
Party	Candidate	Votes	%	±%
PAP	Lim Biow Chuan	15,331	71.86	▲13.24
SPP	Jeannette Chong-Aruldoss	6,004	28.14	▼13.24
Majority		9,327	43.72	▲26.48
Total valid votes		21,335	98.46	▲0.46
Rejected ballots		334	2.34	▼0.46
Turnout		21,669	89.75	▲1.83
Registered electors		24,143		▲1.74
PAP hold		Swing	▲13.24	

=== Elections in 2020s ===
General Election 2020
Party	Candidate	Votes	%	±%
PAP	Lim Biow Chuan	16,285	73.82	▲1.96
PV	Sivakumaran Chellappa	5,775	26.18	N/A
Majority		10,510	47.64	▲3.92
Total valid votes		22,060	97.39	▼1.07
Rejected ballots		589	2.61	▲1.07
Turnout		22,649	93.41	▲3.66
Registered electors		24,246		▲0.43
PAP hold		Swing	▲1.96	

General Election 2025
Party	Candidate	Votes	%	±%
PAP	Gho Sze Kee	12,602	63.82	▼10.00
Independent	Jeremy Tan	7,143	36.18	N/A
Majority		5,459	27.64	▼20.00
Total valid votes		19,745	97.66	▲0.27
Rejected ballots		474	2.34	▼0.27
Turnout		20,219	88.51	▼4.90
Registered electors		22,843		▼5.79
PAP hold		Swing	▼10.00	
