= Lim Biow Chuan =

Singaporean politician and lawyer (born 1963)

- 林谋泉
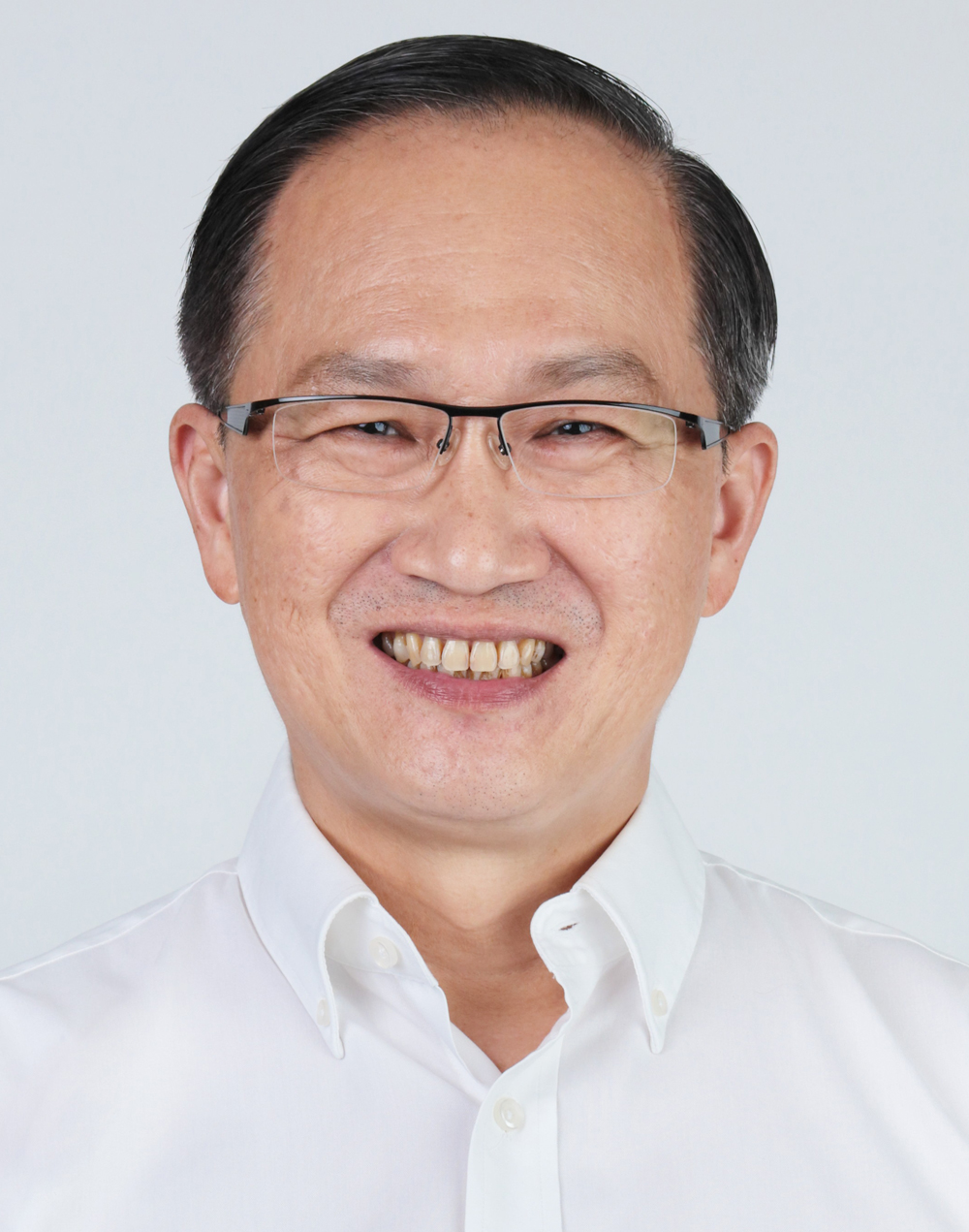
- Official portrait, 2021

Deputy Speaker of the Parliament of Singapore
- In office 25 January 2016 – 23 June 2020 Serving with Charles Chong
- Speaker: Halimah Yacob; Tan Chuan-Jin
- Preceded by: Seah Kian Peng; Charles Chong
- Succeeded by: Jessica Tan; Christopher de Souza

Member of Parliament for Mountbatten SMC
- In office 7 May 2011 – 15 April 2025
- Preceded by: Constituency established
- Succeeded by: Gho Sze Kee
- Majority: 2011: 3,524 (17.24%); 2015: 9,327 (43.72%); 2020: 10,479 (47.68%)

Member of Parliament for Marine Parade GRC
- In office 6 May 2006 – 7 May 2011
- Preceded by: PAP held
- Succeeded by: PAP held
- Majority: N/A (walkover)

Personal details
- Born: 22 May 1963 (age 63) Colony of Singapore
- Party: People's Action Party
- Education: National University of Singapore (LLB)

Lim Biow Chuan (Chinese: 林谋泉; pinyin: Lín Móuquán; born 22 May 1963) is a Singaporean lawyer and former politician who served as Deputy Speaker of the Parliament of Singapore between 2016 and 2020. A member of the governing People's Action Party (PAP), he was the Member of Parliament (MP) for the Mountbatten division of Marine Parade Group Representation Constituency (GRC) between 2006 and 2011, and Mountbatten Single Member Constituency (SMC) between 2011 and 2025.

== Education ==
Lim studied at Victoria School and Temasek Junior College before entering the Faculty of Law at the National University of Singapore (NUS), where he completed a Bachelor of Laws. At NUS, he was a classmate of Sylvia Lim, future MP for the opposition Workers' Party (WP).

== Career ==
Lim is a qualified lawyer. As of May 2016, he was a senior partner in Derrick Wong & Lim BC LLP and had been a Notary Public and Commissioner for Oaths.

Lim served as the president of the Consumers Association of Singapore (CASE) from 2012 to 2021. He was succeeded by Melvin Yong.

In 2013, Lim was appointed to the Data Protection Advisory Committee (DPAC) of Singapore.

=== Political career ===
Lim entered politics during the 2006 general election as part of the PAP team for Marine Parade GRC. He served the Mountbatten division of the GRC after the team won unopposed.

During the 2011 general election, Lim stood for reelection in Mountbatten SMC after his division in Marine Parade GRC was carved out. He defeated Jeannette Chong-Aruldoss from the National Solidarity Party (NSP) with 58.72% of the vote.

During the 2015 general election, Lim defeated Chong-Aruldoss, who had since become a member of the Singapore People's Party (SPP), with an improved 71.86% of the vote.

On 25 January 2016, Lim was elected Deputy Speaker for the 13th Parliament alongside Charles Chong. He left the role after the 2020 general election.

During the 2020 general election, Lim was reelected for the third time after defeating Sivakumaran Chellappa from Peoples Voice (PV) with an improved 73.82% of the vote. This was despite a national swing against the PAP.

During the 2025 general election, it was announced that Lim would retire from politics. He was replaced as the PAP candidate for Mountbatten SMC by Gho Sze Kee, a political newcomer.

Lim was the chairperson of Marine Parade Town Council from 2010 to April 2025.

==== Extramarital affair controversy ====
In 2010, the press reported that Lim showed support for film director Jack Neo over his controversial extramarital affair, saying, "Since he is remorseful over this incident, he should be forgiven. Actually, a man who has a good career development, like himself, would find such scenarios unavoidable". Lim later claimed to have been misquoted by the press.

== Personal life ==
Lim is married and has two children. He is a Christian; as of May 2016, he was the chairperson of the executive committee of Ang Mo Kio Methodist Church.

Parliament of Singapore
Preceded by Andy Gan; Goh Chok Tong; Mohamad Maidin bin Packer Mohd; Othman Haron Eusofe; R Ravindran; Lim Hwee Hua	Member of Parliament for Marine Parade GRC; 2006 – 2011; Served alongside: Fatimah Lateef, Goh Chok Tong, Muhammad Faishal Ibrahim, Ong Seh Hong, Seah Kian Peng	Succeeded by Fatimah Lateef; Goh Chok Tong; Seah Kian Peng; Tan Chuan-Jin; Tin Pei Ling
New constituency	Member of Parliament for Mountbatten SMC; 2011 – 2025	Succeeded by Gho Sze Kee
