= Tin Pei Ling =

Singaporean politician (born 1983)

The Honourable Tin Pei Ling
- 陈佩玲
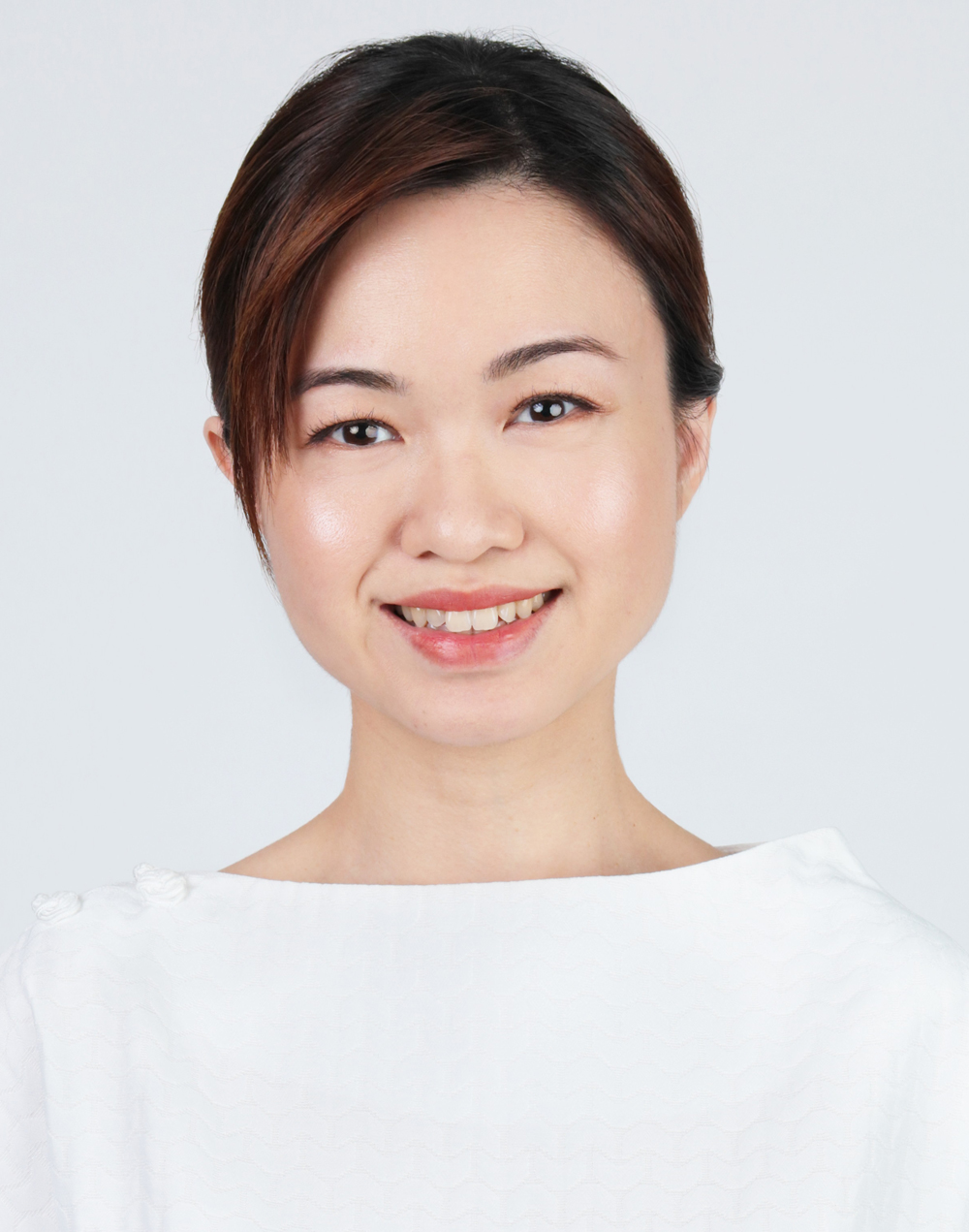
- Official portrait, 2021

Member of the Singapore Parliament for Marine Parade–Braddell Heights GRC
- Incumbent
- Assumed office 23 April 2025
- Preceded by: Constituency established
- Majority: N/A (walkover)

Member of the Singapore Parliament for MacPherson SMC
- In office 11 September 2015 – 15 April 2025
- Preceded by: Constituency established
- Succeeded by: Constituency abolished
- Majority: 2015: 8,401 (31.98%); 2020: 11,506 (43.48%)

Member of the Singapore Parliament for Marine Parade GRC
- In office 7 May 2011 – 24 August 2015
- Preceded by: PAP held
- Succeeded by: PAP held
- Majority: 18,360 (13.30%)

Personal details
- Born: 23 December 1983 (age 42) Singapore
- Party: People's Action Party
- Spouse: Ng How Yue
- Children: 2
- Education: National University of Singapore (BSocSci); University of Chicago (MBA)
- Occupation: Politician; businesswoman

Tin Pei Ling (Note: Chinese: 陈佩玲; pinyin: Chén Pèilíng) (born 23 December 1983) is a Singaporean politician and businesswoman. A member of the governing People's Action Party (PAP), she has been the Member of Parliament (MP) representing the MacPherson division of Marine Parade–Braddell Heights Group Representation Constituency (GRC) since 2025. She had previously represented the MacPherson division of Marine Parade GRC from 2011 to 2015 and MacPherson Single Member Constituency (SMC) from 2015 to 2025.

Tin was the PAP's youngest candidate during the 2011 general election.

== Early life and education ==
Tin's father operated a coffeeshop in Ghim Moh while her mother was a housewife.

She attended Crescent Girls' School and Hwa Chong Junior College before graduating from the National University of Singapore with a Bachelor of Social Sciences degree with honours in psychology.

From 2013 to 2015, Tin did a Master of Business Administration with University of Chicago Booth School of Business.

Tin's father was involved in grassroots work and Tin helped him with English translations. In her second year in university, she started helping out at Vivian Balakrishnan's Meet-the-People Sessions.

Prior to the formation of the 17th Young PAP Executive Committee marked by the 2011 general election, Tin was the assistant treasurer for Young PAP and a representative for the Ulu Pandan Branch.

== Business career ==
Prior to entering politics, Tin was a senior associate at Ernst & Young. She resigned after being elected as a Member of Parliament in the 2011 general election.

In May 2017, Tin started working at Jing King Tech Group, an investment firm, as its group director for corporate strategy before leaving to join Business China on 21 May 2018.

Tin served as the chief executive officer of Business China—a government related non-profit organisation aiming to strengthen Singapore–China ties through the support of businesses—between May 2018 and December 2022.

In February 2023, Tin accepted the role of Director of Public Affairs and Policy from Grab, a Singapore-based technology company. This led to public questions of possible conflicts of interest, as she was also the chairperson for the Communications and Information Government Parliamentary Committee (GPC). After several days, Grab decided to change Tin's role to that of a director of corporate development. Tin announced in August 2023 that she was leaving Grab, seven months into her role there.

== Political career ==
Tin made her electoral debut in the 2011 general election as part of a five-member PAP team led by then-Senior Minister Goh Chok Tong, contesting in Marine Parade GRC; said team won 56.65% of the vote against that of the National Solidarity Party (NSP) led by Cheo Chai Chen.

In an article about NSP candidate Nicole Seah and her popularity on social media, the Asia Sentinel claimed that, having been a member of the Young PAP at the Ulu Pandan branch for seven years, Tin was fielded by the PAP as a candidate to attract the "unpredictable" youth vote through social networking sites. She was instead made fun of for her youth and perceived immaturity. After the election, Goh said that Tin's youth and negative public image factored into the PAP's weakened performance in the Marine Parade GRC of 2011. CNA compared the result to that of the 1992 by-election in the GRC, when the PAP won 72.9% of the vote; it was the last time the GRC was contested prior to 2011.

On 1 June 2011, Tin announced on her Facebook account that she had resigned from her senior associate position with Ernst & Young, where she had worked for four years, to focus on her parliamentary responsibilities full-time. Tin also earned a degree as an Executive Master of Business Administration at the University of Chicago Booth School of Business during this period.

During the 2015 general election, Tin's MacPherson division in Marine Parade GRC was carved out as an SMC; she ran against Bernard Chen from the Workers' Party (WP) and Cheo, the leader of the NSP team for Marine Parade GRC in the previous election. Cheo's campaign suffered major damage when he described Tin's new role as a mother as "her weakness" in the campaign. Facing public backlash, he later claimed that this comment was meant as a joke. Tin won 65.58% of the vote, compared to Chen's 33.6% and Cheo's 0.82%; Cheo lost his electoral deposit for not receiving at least 12.5% of the vote.

During the 2020 general election, Tin retained MacPherson SMC with 71.74% of the vote against Goh Meng Seng, the founder and leader of the People's Power Party (PPP). She was later appointed as Chair of the Government Parliamentary Committee for Communications and Information in the 14th Parliament.

Prior to the 2025 general election, MacPherson SMC was subsumed into the newly formed Marine Parade–Braddell Heights GRC; Tin was thus fielded as part of a five-member PAP team. As no other teams were nominated, a walkover in the GRC was declared on Nomination Day, 23 April 2025, contrary to expectations that the WP would contest there. Tin was later appointed as Chair of the Government Parliamentary Committee for Transport.

== Personal life ==
Tin is married to Ng How Yue, Permanent Secretary (Health Development) in the Ministry of Health and formerly a Principal Private Secretary to Prime Minister Lee Hsien Loong. Tin and Ng have two children.

== Notes ==
Parliament of Singapore
Preceded by Seah Kian Peng; Fatimah Lateef; Muhammad Faishal Ibrahim; Ong Seh Hong; Goh Chok Tong; Lim Biow Chuan	Member of Parliament for Marine Parade GRC; 2011 – 2015; Served alongside: Fatimah Lateef, Tan Chuan-Jin, Seah Kian Peng, Goh Chok Tong	Succeeded by Seah Kian Peng; Fatimah Lateef; Edwin Tong; Tan Chuan-Jin; Goh Chok Tong
New constituency	Member of Parliament for MacPherson SMC; 2015 – 2025	Constituency abolished
New constituency	Member of Parliament for Marine Parade–Braddell Heights GRC; 2025 – present Served alongside: (2025–present): Muhammad Faishal Ibrahim, Goh Pei Ming, Diana Pang	Incumbent
