= Gho Sze Kee =

Singaporean politician

- 吴诗琪
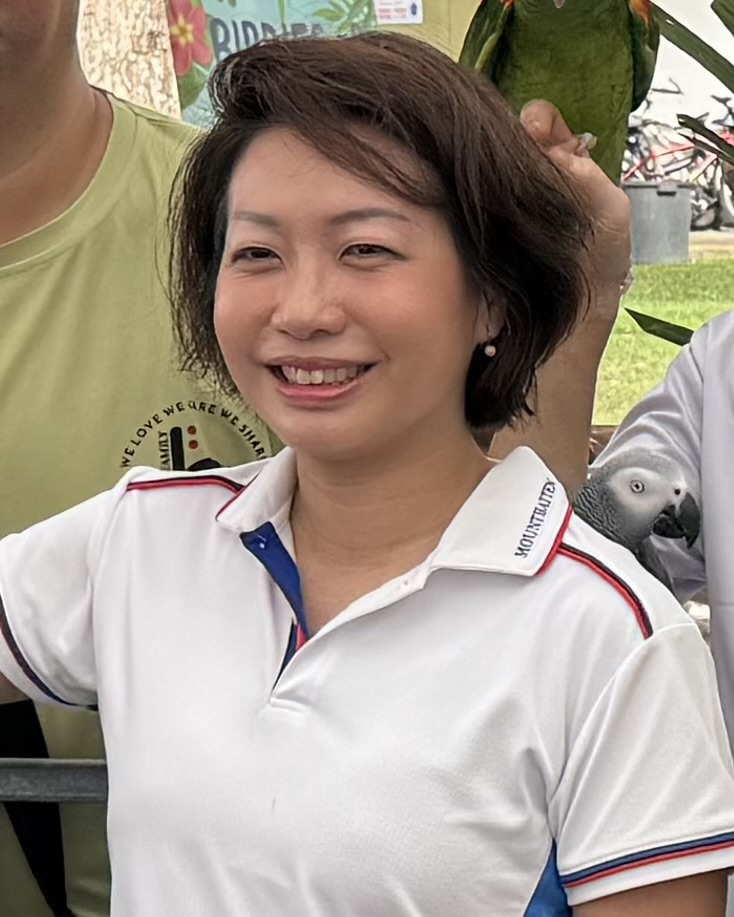
- Gho in 2025

Member of the Singapore Parliament for Mountbatten SMC
- Incumbent
- Assumed office 3 May 2025
- Preceded by: Lim Biow Chuan
- Majority: 5,459 (27.64%)

Personal details
- Born: 9 April 1979 (age 47) Singapore
- Party: People's Action Party
- Occupation: Lawyer

Gho Sze Kee (Note: Chinese: 吴诗琪; pinyin: Wú Shīqí) (born 9 April 1979) is a Singaporean shipping lawyer and politician. She has been representing the Mountbatten Single Member Constituency (SMC) as a member of the governing People's Action Party (PAP) since 2025.

== Career ==
Gho's current profession is a shipping lawyer. She is an associate director at Singaporean law firm AsiaLegal, which specialises in maritime issues such as marine insurance.

=== Political career ===
In April 2025, Gho was announced as the PAP candidate for Mountbatten SMC in the 2025 general election after the retirement of incumbent Lim Biow Chuan. She defeated independent candidate Jeremy Tan with 63.82% of the vote. Gho has served as the Vice-Chairman of the Marine Parade–Braddell Heights Batok Town Council since 2025.

== Honors ==
Gho was awarded the Public Service Medal in 2023.

== Notes ==
Parliament of Singapore
Preceded by Lim Biow Chuan	Member of Parliament for Mountbatten SMC; 2025–present	Incumbent
