= Joo Seng =

- Subzone of Toa Payoh Planning Area

Name transcription(s)
  - Chinese: 裕成; Yùchéng (Pinyin); Jū-sêng (Hokkien POJ); Jŭ-sêng (Teochew PUJ)
  - Malay: Joo Seng
- Country: Singapore

Joo Seng (Chinese: 裕成) is a subzone located in Toa Payoh in the Central Region of Singapore. There are some condominiums and houses in the area. It is also where the Gurkha Contingent is based. There are many Gurkhas and their families living there in private flats.

== Location ==
Joo Seng is located in mid-northeast Singapore forming part of the central district. It is situated just south of Hougang and borders Serangoon and Upper Aljunied.

== Amenities ==
There are a few amenities for residents living in Joo Seng. There is a Prime Supermarket, several Kopitiam (coffeeshops), a laundromat, a hair salon, a hotel and various general goods stores. Bartley MRT station links Joo Seng with Junction 8, Serangoon Bus Interchange and Serangoon Town Centre. The nearby Woodleigh MRT station also provides easy access to places such as Punggol, Dhoby Ghaut and Clarke Quay.

== Education ==
There are a few educational institutions in Joo Seng.

- Cedar Primary School
- Cedar Girls' Secondary School
- Bartley Secondary School
- Maris Stella High School

There used to be another school, Elling Primary School, which closed down in the mid-1990s.

== See also ==
- Mount Vernon, Singapore
- Outer Ring Road System
- Bartley MRT station
