= Marine Parade–Braddell Heights Group Representation Constituency =

Electoral division in Singapore

Marine Parade–Braddell Heights
- Group Representation constituency for the Parliament of Singapore
- Region: Central, North-East and East Regions, Singapore
- Electorate: 131,820

Current constituency
- Created: 2025; 1 year ago
- Seats: 5
- Party: People's Action Party
- Members: Goh Pei Ming; Diana Pang; Seah Kian Peng; Tin Pei Ling
- Town Council: Marine Parade–Braddell Heights
- Created from: MacPherson SMC; Marine Parade GRC; Mountbatten SMC; Potong Pasir SMC

The Marine Parade–Braddell Heights Group Representation Constituency is a five-member group representation constituency (GRC) located in central, eastern and north-eastern Singapore. It has five divisions: Braddell Heights, Geylang Serai, Kembangan, MacPherson, and Marine Parade, managed by Marine Parade–Braddell Heights Town Council. The current Members of Parliament (MPs) for the GRC are Goh Pei Ming, Diana Pang, Seah Kian Peng and Tin Pei Ling from the governing People's Action Party (PAP).

== History ==
Prior to the 2025 general election, Marine Parade–Braddell Heights GRC was created from Marine Parade GRC. The remainder of the former comprised selected polling districts in the single-member constituencies (SMCs) of Mountbatten and Potong Pasir, as well as the entirety of MacPherson SMC. HDB estates in Chai Chee and the entire Joo Chiat division were moved from Marine Parade GRC to East Coast GRC.

Tan See Leng, the Minister for Manpower, was slated to lead the PAP team, but was replaced at the last minute by Goh, a political newcomer, having been redeployed to lead the PAP team for Chua Chu Kang GRC; Seah, being the Speaker of Parliament, was subsequently tasked with anchoring Marine Parade–Braddell Heights GRC.

Before Nomination Day, it was assumed that the Workers' Party (WP) and the National Solidarity Party (NSP) could contest the constituency against the PAP. However, the NSP pulled out from the race, and on the day itself, the WP, contrary to expectations, did not nominate a team to contest the GRC, leading to a walkover being declared for the PAP. This was the first walkover in a general election since 2011.

WP leader Pritam Singh attributed the party's reasoning behind not contesting the GRC to limited resources and an extensive redrawing of electoral boundaries from the previous Marine Parade GRC. However, the walkover drew criticism from several smaller opposition parties which stated that they were taken by surprise and disappointment, and that every constituency should be contested.

== Members of Parliament ==
Divisions or wards of Marine Parade–Braddell Heights GRC as of the 2025 general election:
1 Braddell Heights
2 Geylang Serai
3 Kembangan
4 MacPherson
5 Marine Parade

| Year | Division | Members of Parliament | Party |
|---|---|---|---|
Formation
| 2025 | Braddell Heights; Geylang Serai; Kembangan; MacPherson; Marine Parade | Seah Kian Peng; Diana Pang; Muhammad Faishal Ibrahim (2025-2026) (Note: Resigned from Parliament on 20 July 2026); Tin Pei Ling; Goh Pei Ming | PAP |

== Electoral results ==
Note: The Elections Department does not include rejected votes when calculating the vote shares of candidates. Hence, all candidates' vote shares will total to 100% at any given election (may not appear so in multi-way contests due to rounding).

=== Elections in 2020s ===
General Election 2025
| Party | Candidate | Votes | % |
|---|---|---|---|
| PAP | Goh Pei Ming; Muhammad Faishal Ibrahim; Diana Pang; Seah Kian Peng; Tin Pei Ling | Unopposed | |
| Registered electors | | 131,820 | |
| PAP win (new seat) | | | |
