= Diana Pang (Singaporean politician) =

Singaporean politician (born 1974)

The Honourable Diana Pang PBM
- 彭丽燕
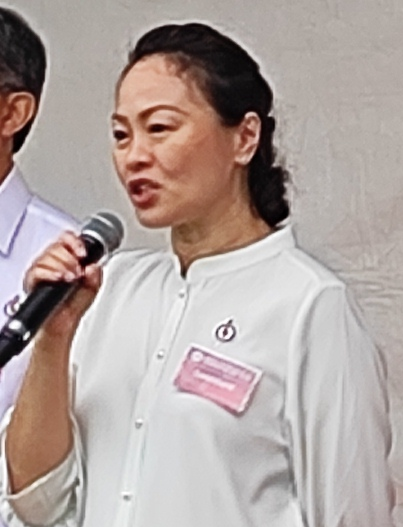
- Pang in 2025

Member of Parliament for Marine Parade–Braddell Heights GRC
- Incumbent
- Assumed office 23 April 2025
- Preceded by: Constituency established
- Majority: N/A (walkover)

Personal details
- Born: Diana Pang Li Yen; 26 March 1974 (age 52) Singapore
- Party: People's Action Party
- Children: 1
- Occupation: Politician; Business Executive

Diana Pang Li Yen (Note: Chinese: 彭丽燕; pinyin: Péng Lìyàn) PBM (born 26 March 1974) is a Singaporean business executive. A member of the governing People's Action Party (PAP), she has been the Member of Parliament (MP) for the Geylang Serai division of Marine Parade–Braddell Heights Group Representation Constituency (GRC) since 2025.

== Education ==
In 1997, Pang graduated from Curtin University with a double degree in accounting and business management.

== Career ==
Pang is a business development director in the areas of audit, tax and business advisory. In 2019, she became a registered solemniser. As of March 2025, she was the second vice-president of Singapore Council of Women's Organisations, and chaired the Women’s Integration Network Council of the People's Association and the Fengshan Women’s Executive Committee.

=== Political career ===
During the 2025 general election, Pang was fielded as part of a five-member PAP team for Marine Parade–Braddell Heights GRC. On Nomination Day, 23 April, the team was declared to have been elected unopposed after the Workers' Party (WP), which had been expected to contest the GRC, did not file a nomination for it.

== Personal life ==
Pang is married and has a daughter.

== Awards ==
- Pingat Bakti Masyarakat, 2011

== Notes ==
| New constituency | Member of Parliament for Marine Parade–Braddell Heights GRC; 2025–present Served alongside: (2025–present): Muhammad Faishal Ibrahim, Tin Pei Ling, Goh Pei Ming | Incumbent |
