= Esther An =

Esther An is an expert in corporate sustainability in Singapore. In 2018, An became the first person from Singapore to be recognized as a UN SDG Pioneer. An is the Chief Sustainability Officer of City Development Limited (CDL), a Singaporean multinational real estate operating organization, and serves as a board member, chair, or founder of many corporate sustainability-focused groups.

== Early life ==
An was born and raised in Hong Kong. As a child, she was passionate about nature.

== Career ==
An began her career in public relations in Hong Kong. Her first job was promoting Hong Kong's "Clean and Green" campaign.

=== City Development Limited ===
An joined CDL in 1995 in a PR capacity. Along with Kwek Leng Joo, An helped establish the corporate ethos of "Conserving as we Construct. Under An's guidance, CDL has been recognized as a leader in corporate sustainability numerous times, such as the Time's World's Most Sustainable Companies and Corporate Knights' The Global 100 List. In 2022, she created the CDL Future Value 2030 Sustainability Blueprint to further these goals.

=== Nonprofits ===
An has also served on international and local sustainability organizations. She is the Chair of World Green Building Council’s (WorldGBC) Corporate Advisory Board, developed the Young CSR Leaders Award in collaboration with Global Compact Network Singapore, founded the Business Council for Sustainable Development Singapore, and serves on the property working group of the United Nations Environment Programme – Finance Initiative. In 2022, An became a G20 Empower Advocate.

== Recognition ==
An has been recognized on various lists for contributions to corporate sustainability:

- UN SDG Pioneer for Green Infrastructure and a Low-Carbon Economy
- Time 100 Climate for 2023
- Eco-Business A-Listers
