= Delfi Orchard =

Housing and shopping complex in Singapore

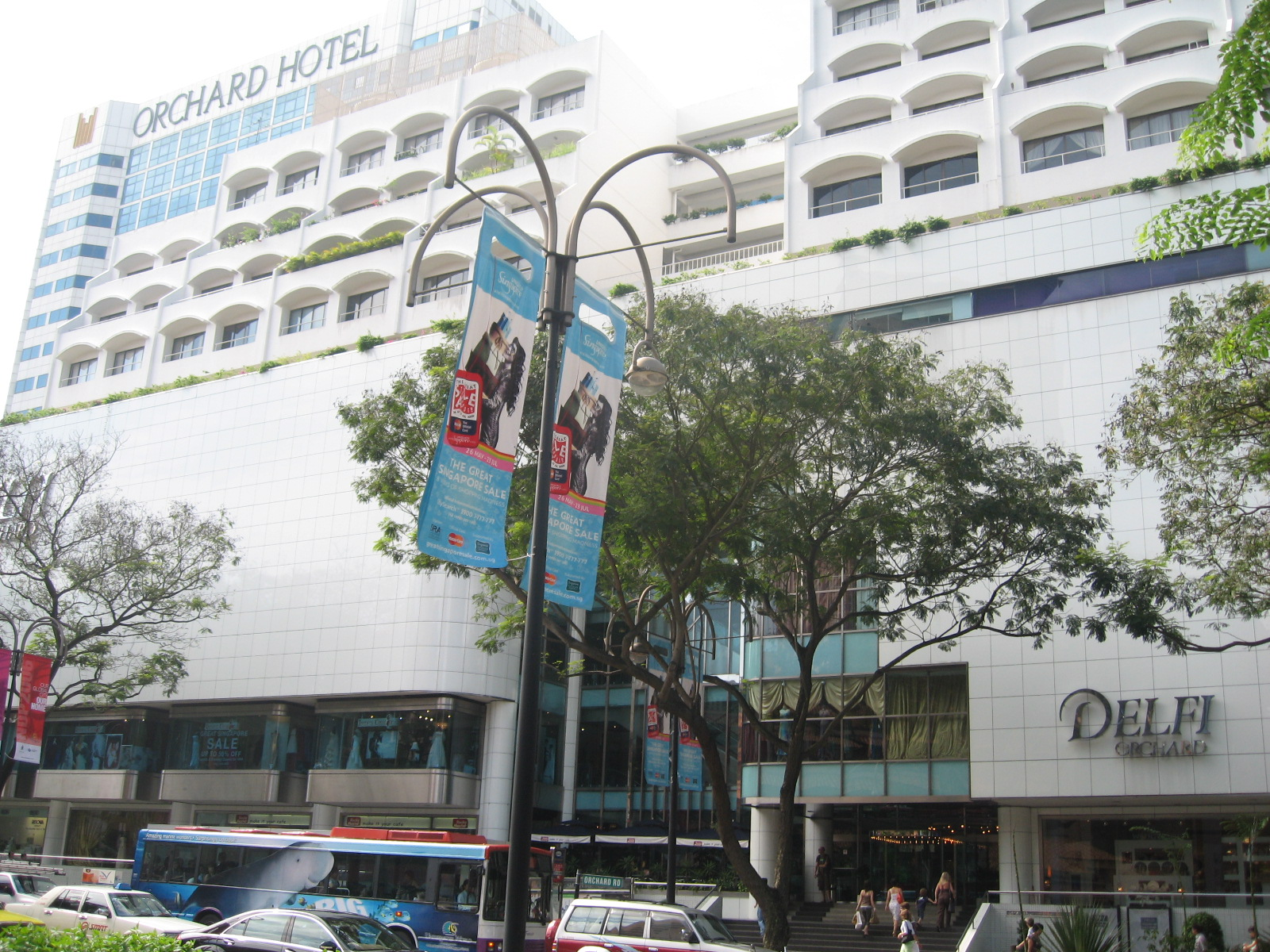
- Delfi Orchard in 2006
- Interactive map of the Delfi Orchard area

General information
- Type: Shopping mall and apartment
- Location: 402 Orchard Road, Singapore 238876
- Coordinates: 1.30723°N 103.82848°E
- Year built: 2
- Groundbreaking: July 1982
- Construction started: July 1983
- Opened: November 1984
- Owner: City Developments Limited

Technical details
- Floor count: 11 (five-storey shopping mall, six-storey residential apartment)

Design and construction
- Architects: Urban Life Architect and Engineers Inc

Delfi Orchard is a housing and shopping complex at the junction of Orchard Road and Claymore Road in Singapore. Completed in 1984, it comprises a six storey residential block sitting atop a five-storey retail podium, with the latter featuring a façade clad with 'neopariés'.

On its opening, the mall was targeted at international tourists, businessmen and Singaporean shoppers, with upmarket goods sold on the first floor and a department store on the second floor catering to the local middle-class. In 1991, a majority of its units were acquired by City Developments Limited who initially intended it as a frontage for the Orchard Hotel. By the 1990s, it had lost a number of its luxury goods tenants and a third of its retail units were left vacant, though it remained a hub for stores catering to bridal couples.

In 2024, the complex was acquired by a subsidiary of City Developments Limited through a collective sale. The company announced that it would consider redeveloping the building with adjacent properties.

== History ==
=== Planning and construction ===
Japanese real estate developer Yamasin Enterprise Pte. Ltd. announced in August 1982 that they were developing a housing, office and shopping complex catering to tourists and businessmen staying in hotels in the area. Yamasin was reportedly the "first Japanese concern to develop a commercial property" in the country and Delfi Orchard was their "first substantial investment in the retail space." Located in a plot of land next to the Orchard Hotel initially at the junction of Orchard Road and Claymore Drive and later at the junction of Orchard Road and Claymore Road, it was situated within what was then "one of the last undeveloped" stretches of the former road. It was previously occupied by a row of shophouses beside Claymore Hill. The complex was named after the Ancient Greek site Delphi, as it was once known as the "centre of the world".

At the announcement, construction was to be carried out by Science and Engineering Investment Pte. Ltd., also a Japanese firm, and was then estimated to cost $27 million, $1.2 million of which was to go to the façade. Science and Engineering Investment were also appointed the complex's managers, which Yamasin Enterprise claimed was to "ensure that a prestigious image is retained." An additional $10 million was paid to the previous tenants as compensation. The complex was then scheduled to be completed by 1984. Japanese construction firm Ohbayashi-Gumi later won the $28 million contract for the project's construction. Piling works began in July 1982, and construction began in July the following year. It was estimated around then that the complex would be completed by August 1984 and that construction would cost $70 million.

Designed by Japanese architectural firm Urban Life Architect and Engineers Inc, the complex was to comprise a six-storey residential and office block above a five-storey retail podium. The mall was to have 126 retail units and a restaurant. Its tenants were to be entirely "exclusive, high class commodity stores" such as boutiques and jewellers, with plans for a Japanese department store as an anchor tenant. In the block's top five floors, there were to be 23 service apartments, of which nine were studio apartments and the rest regular two-bedroom apartments. These were targeted at businessmen, and by July 1984, the apartment block reportedly had a waiting list with 60 people. The block's bottom floor was reserved instead for offices, primarily those of the companies of Yamosin's parent Yamamoto Fudosan Company. The building was also to have a carpark occupying three basement floors with a capacity for 92 vehicles. This meant that, at its completion, it was the only shopping centre in the country to have facilities three floors underground.

The architects reportedly saw the building as a "lady", and so they incorporated "curving corners" into the design to give the complex what they described as a "female look." The façade was to be made of 'neopariés', a glass-based white marble "look-alike" which cost twice as much as marble which "does not weather in the presence of carbon monoxide and carbon dioxide from car fumes." Additionally, it does not absorb water, and so it is "less prone to fungal growth." It was to be "self-cleaning" in that it would be washed whenever it rained, resulting in "lower maintenance costs." The material was selected partially as marble "could not achieve the soft approach needed in creating curves." The building was to have a 70m-long frontage, which was then one of the longest frontages along Orchage Road. The building's interior was decorated with chandeliers, costing a "small fortune" of $150,000. This was reportedly a "first" for a mall in the country.

=== Opening ===
The complex opened in November 1984, then managed by Daikin. Around 30% to 40% of its tenants were Japanese. The retail podium's first floor housed the upmarket stores aimed at tourists and businessmen. The tenants at opening were of an "international mix" such as to cater to both tourists and locals. It reportedly "introduced the concept of pre-designed shop fronts to achieve uniformity and save tenants from construction expenses." The sixth floor of the complex was occupied entirely by a 100-seat outlet of the restaurant chain Suntory, its first in Singapore, which served Japanese cuisine and had its waitresses wear kimonos. To counter the fact that there were "too many" malls in Singapore, Yamasin had arranged for free transportation between the complex and two separate hotels. The Meitetsu Department Store chain opened its first overseas outlet in the podium as an anchor tenant, occupying half of the second floor. The store was to target "middle-class Singaporeans" as Meitetsu had come to the conclusion that there were "too many high-society fashion goods along Orchard already." It was then one of the chain's smallest outlets. At its opening, it was a "ladies-only" store. By January 1985, the apartments were reportedly "selling briskly".

However, the country entered its first post-independence recession in 1985, resulting in many retail units lying vacant. In 1986, Dick Lee, a singer-and-songwriter who had founded the Society of Designing Arts two years prior and who had established an office within the building, asked the complex's management if he could establish a boutique supporting local fashion designers on the largely empty third floor "rent-free". The management gave him the go-ahead and he founded Hemispheres, which was a "marketplace of sorts where each designer had his own booth." The concept was, for a while, a "roaring success." In December 1987, it was announced that the mall's entire fourth floor was to be occupied by stores catering to bridal couples. The floor had previously been occupied by the Yeo Teck Seng department store, which vacated the premises in November. After this, Irene Teo, the owner of the bridal boutique Irene's Creation within the mall, suggested that the floor be converted into a "one-stop shopping floor" for bridal couples and a "wedding centre", with the ten units being taken up by businesses such as florists and photographers. The mall's management went with her idea and put her in charge of curating the mix of tenants and ensuring that there was "no duplication" in the products and services offered.

The Meitetsu closed for two and a half months of renovations in 1989 and reopened with only half of the original space being occupied by the department store, with the rest of the floor being leased out to five designer boutiques, of which two also catered to men. However, the outlet was to remain primarily a "working woman's store". In that period, the mall was known for its boutiques and the department store offering clothing and accessories, as well as for "classy home furnishings". Hemispheres closed down due to "poor business" in 1990, as the boutique was unable to compete with foreign brands.

=== CDL and decline ===
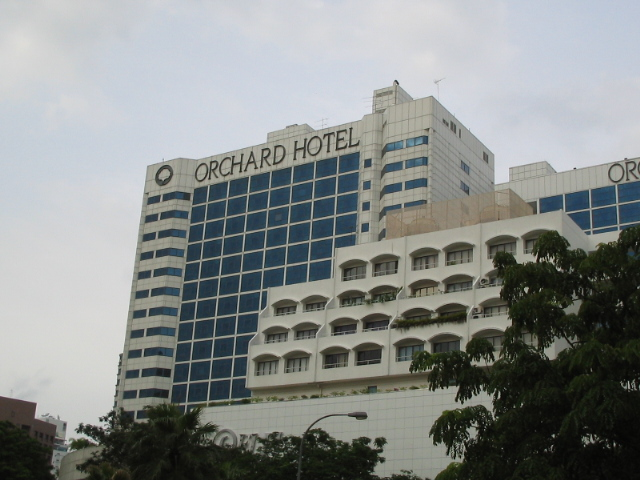
The Orchard Hotel behind Delfi Orchard.

Real estate firm City Developments Limited (CDL) confirmed in May 1991 that they had acquired 118 units at Delfi Orchard for $95 million. The deal was made through CDL's subsidiary Allinvest Holding. They announced that they would be paying $7.3 million in annual interested, which Lee Han Shih of The Business Times wrote "suggested the bulk of the $95 million would come from borrowings." He noted that the complex's rental income before interest for the year of 1990 amounted to only $1.6 million, which meant that CDL was to "suffer" a loss of $5.8 million annually from the deal. The company claimed that the deal would "ensure good recurrent rental income", though it "did not fully explain" why it had gone through with it. According to Lee, it was believed that the acquisition was part of a plan to connect the mall with the CDL-owned Orchard Hotel, also on Claymore Road, such that the hotel would have a frontage on Orchard Road.

In September, CDL announced that there were plans to connect Delfi Orchard to the hotel's shopping arcade as a part of the hotel's expansion, and that the mall would serve as the front for the entire retail section. CDL announced two months after that the acquisition would be refinanced through a one-for-10 rights issue which was to raise $131.5 million to $140 million. Elaine Koh of The Business Times reported that this had been "long expected by the market." Lee wrote in August 1992 that the deal had been a "puzzle from the very beginning" and that, with the local retail industry facing a "slump", the mall would not be able to "good recurrent rental income" in the short-term. He reported that it was generally believed that this would not likely be generated in the long-term either, as Ngee Ann City was set to open on the other end of Orchard Road. Lee opined that the amount CDL had paid for the complex was "too much" as it was located within an "unpopular" stretch of the road, and further noted that it was largely held that the "conditions of the retail industry" would have "force[d] down Yamasin's asking price" in a year or two. Lee then argued that it was likely that CDL "could not afford to play a waiting game" as they needed the mall for the Orchard Hotel, though he questioned why this deal had not been made through "cash-rich" subsidiary CDL Hotels, the owner of Orchard Hotel.

Wong Leong Mein of The Straits Times reported in September 1992 that the mall had become a "ghost town", with 39 of its 126 units lying vacant, including many previously occupied by the luxury goods tenants such as Escada and Etienne Aigner, resulting in the mall "[losing] much of its status as an upmarket complex". CDL then owned 112 of these units. This was attributed to the slump in the retail industry, an "impending oversupply of shop space", the falling demand for luxury goods and the complex's lack of any "theme" or "concept". The company claimed that the situation was "under control" and that they were under "serious negotiations" with some of the owners of the other units. The following year, CDL acquired the neighbouring Palais Renaissance mall, also developed by Yamasin. The Suntory closed in December 1999, with the Japanese staff returning to Japan and the local staff founding the restaurant Chidori at The Quayside on Robertson Quay as a continuation.

Lionel Seah of The Straits Times reported in 2003 that Delfi Orchard was still a "hub" for bridal salons, with nine such stores still operating in the complex. Irene's Creations Bridal was then the "anchor bridal tenant", and had "been there for so long" it was "difficult to get a foot in." Stephanie Gwee opined in August 2009 that the mall was then a "neglected treasure" with a number of fashion and accessories stores, such as local designer Ann Teoh's flagship store, as well as a "wide range of high-end tailor shops." In June 2010, Style:Nordic, which sold lifestyle products from the Nordics, opened its second and flagship store at the ground floor of the complex. Delfi Orchard was selected as the brand's founders felt that its location was "strategic". Today reported in September 2014 that the mall was still a "one-stop shopping destination".

In April 2024, the complex was put up for collective sale with a guide price of $438 million. CDL then owned 125 of the 150 retail units. The following month, the CDL subsidiary CDL Draco acquired the complex. As part of the deal, the tenants of the building were asked to move out within six months. The company announced that it would consider redeveloping the property under the Strategic Development Incentive scheme, which would allow them to increase the plot's gross floor area if it were redeveloped alongside at least two neighbouring properties. It was then reported that there was "growing speculation" that CDL would develop the complex alongside the Orchard Hotel and the Claymore Connect shopping centre, which is also located behind Delfi Orchard, as this would "allow CDL to unlock the full potential of Delfi" and "ride on other redevelopment projects in the vicinity". In June, Tang Contemporary Art opened its first gallery in the country in the complex's penthouse.
