= Informal economy =

Economic activity unregulated by government

Share in informal employment

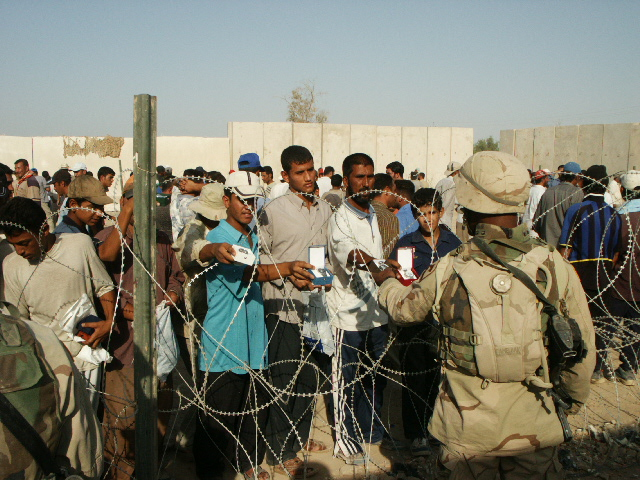
Black market sellers offer watches for sale to US soldiers in Baghdad in 2004.

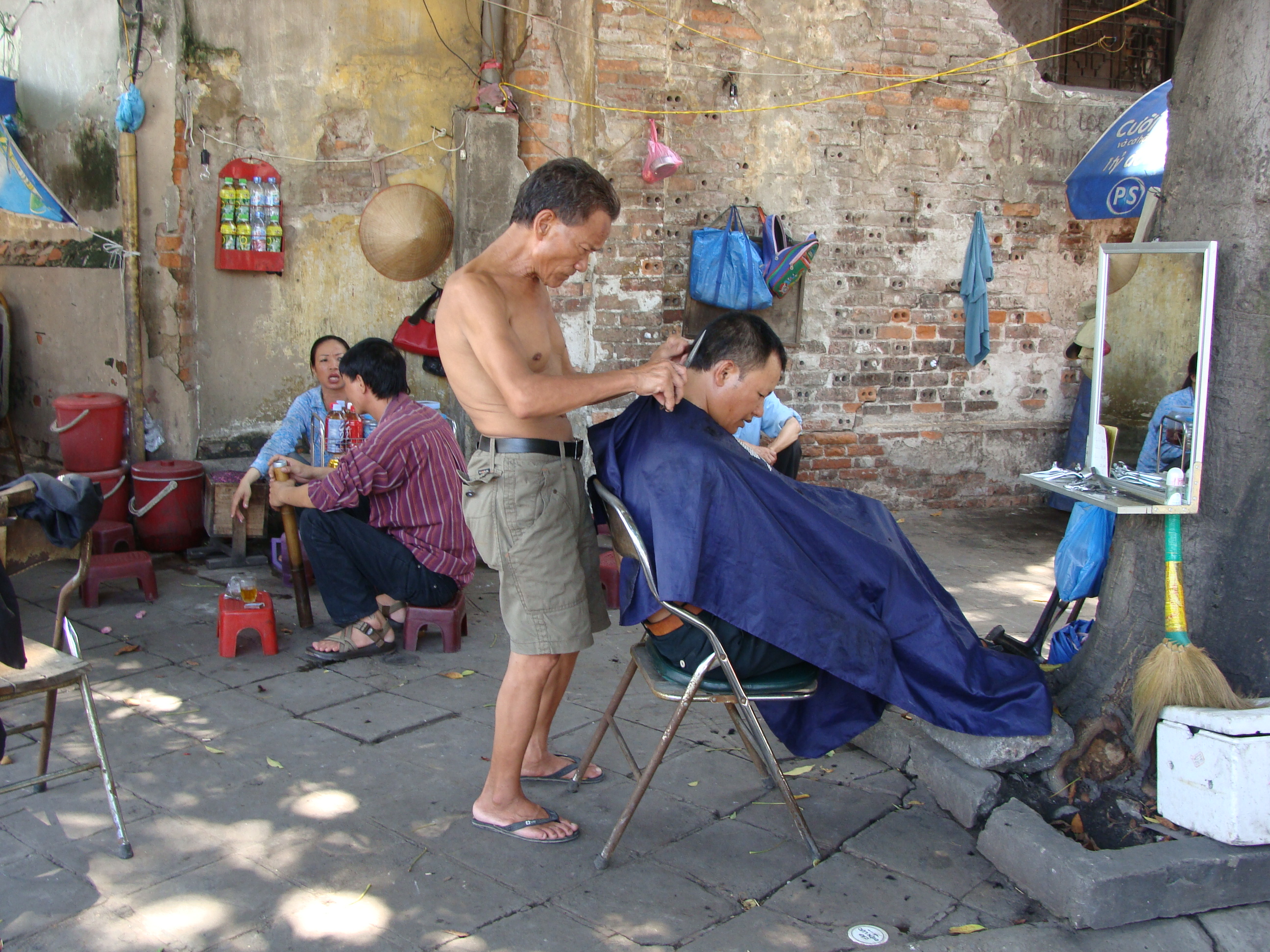
A haircut being given on a sidewalk in Vietnam

An informal economy (informal sector or grey economy) is the part of any economy that is neither taxed nor monitored by any form of government. Although the informal sector makes up a significant portion of the economies in developing countries, it is sometimes stigmatized as troublesome and unmanageable. However, the informal sector provides critical economic opportunities for the poor and has been expanding rapidly since the 1960s. Integrating the informal economy into the formal sector is an important policy challenge.

In many cases, unlike the formal economy, activities of the informal economy are not included in a country's gross national product (GNP) or gross domestic product (GDP). However, Italy has included estimates of informal activity in their GDP calculations since 1987, which swells their GDP by an estimated 18% and in 2014, a number of European countries formally changed their GDP calculations to include prostitution and narcotics sales in their official GDP statistics, in line with international accounting standards, prompting an increase between 3–7%. The informal sector can be described as a grey market in labour. Other concepts that can be characterized as informal sector can include the black market (shadow economy, underground economy), agorism, and System D. Associated idioms include "under the table", "off the books", and "working for cash".

== Definition ==
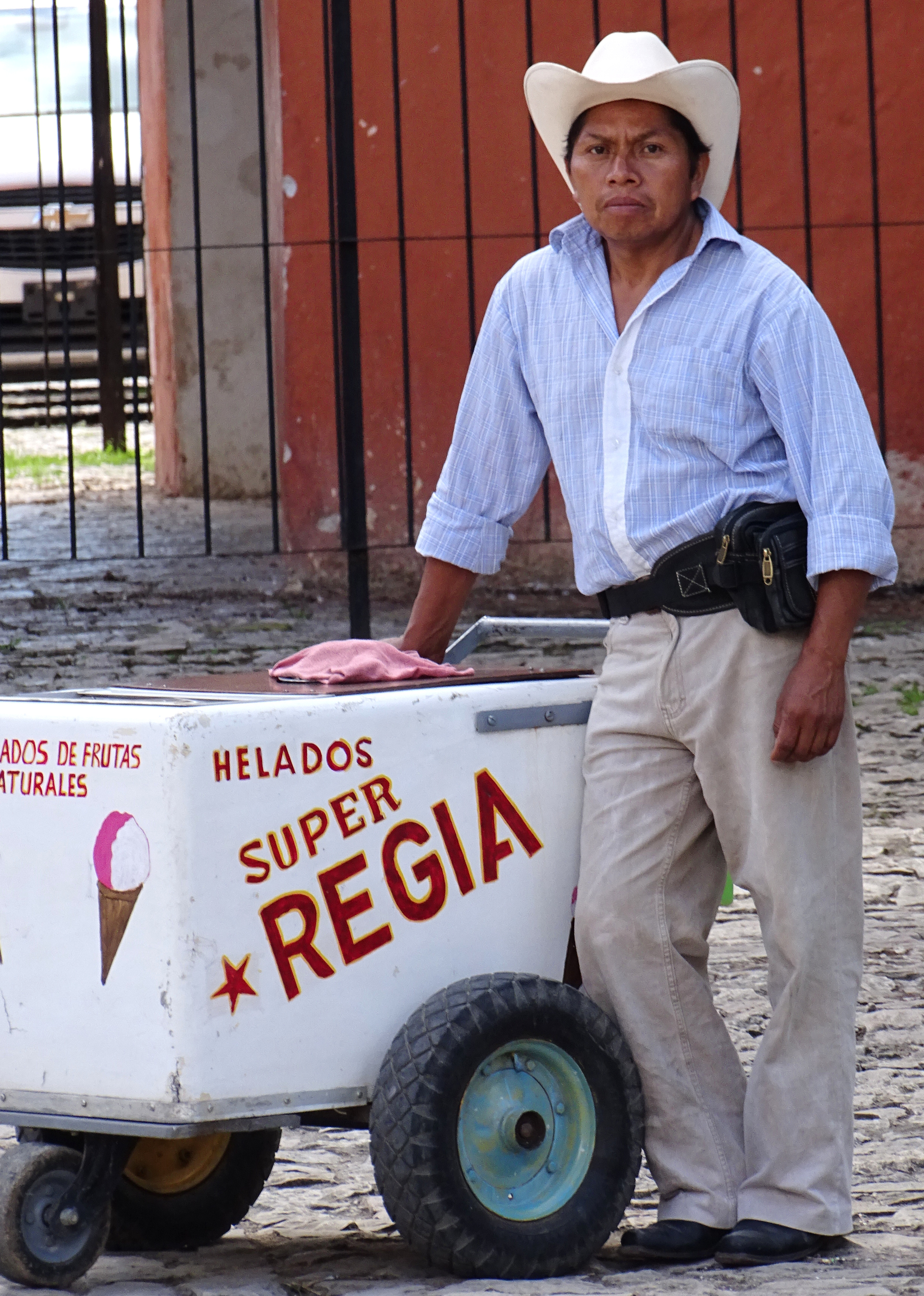
Ice cream street vendor in Mexico

The original use of the term 'informal sector' is attributed to the economic development model put forward in 1955 by W. Arthur Lewis, used to describe employment or livelihood generation primarily within the developing world. It was used to describe a type of employment that was viewed as falling outside of the modern industrial sector. An alternative definition from 2007 uses job security as the measure of formality, defining participants in the informal economy as those "who do not have employment security, work security and social security". While both of these definitions imply a lack of choice or agency in involvement with the informal economy, participation may also be driven by a wish to avoid regulation or taxation. This may manifest as unreported employment, hidden from the state for tax, social security or labour law purposes, but legal in all other aspects. In 2016 Edgar L. Feige proposed a taxonomy for describing unobserved economies including the informal economy as being characterized by some form of "non-compliant behavior with an institutional set of rules". He argues that circumvention of labor market regulations specifying minimum wages, working conditions, social security, unemployment and disability benefits gives rise to an informal economy, which deprives some workers of deserved benefits while conveying undeserved benefits to others.

The term is also useful in describing and accounting for forms of shelter or living arrangements that are similarly unlawful, unregulated, or not afforded protection of the state. 'Informal economy' is increasingly replacing 'informal sector' as the preferred descriptor for this activity.

Informality, both in housing and livelihood generation has historically been seen as a social ill, and described either in terms of what participant's lack, or wish to avoid. In 2009, the Dutch sociologist Saskia Sassen viewed the new 'informal' sector as the product and driver of advanced capitalism and the site of the most entrepreneurial aspects of the urban economy, led by creative professionals such as artists, architects, designers and software developers. While this manifestation of the informal sector remains largely a feature of developed countries, increasingly systems are emerging to facilitate similarly qualified people in developing countries to participate.

Share in informal employment female

Share in informal employment male

== History ==
Governments have tried to regulate aspects of their economies for as long as surplus wealth has existed which is at least as early as Sumer. Yet no such regulation has ever been wholly enforceable.

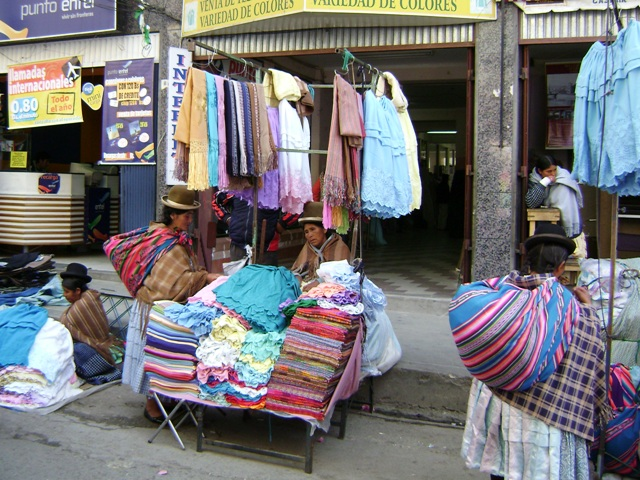
Informal economy in the streets of Bolivia

Archaeological and anthropological evidence strongly suggests that people of all societies regularly adjust their activity within economic systems in attempt to evade regulations. Therefore, if informal economic activity is that which goes unregulated in an otherwise regulated system then informal economies are as old as their formal counterparts, if not older. The term itself, however, is much more recent.

The optimism of the modernization theory school of development had led people in the 1950s and 1960s to believe that traditional forms of work and production would disappear as a result of economic progress in developing countries. As this optimism proved to be unfounded, scholars turned to study more closely what was then called the traditional sector and found that the sector had not only persisted, but in fact expanded to encompass new developments. In accepting that these forms of productions were there to stay, scholars and some international organizations quickly took up the term informal sector (later known as the informal economy or just informality). The term Informal income opportunities is credited to the British anthropologist Keith Hart in a 1971 study on Ghana published in 1973, and was coined by the International Labour Organization in a widely read study on Kenya in 1972.

In his 1989 book The Underground Economies: Tax Evasion and Information Distortion, Edgar L. Feige examined the economic implications of a shift of economic activity from the observed to the non-observed sector of the economy. Such a shift not only reduces the government's ability to collect revenues, it can also bias the nation's information systems and therefore lead to misguided policy decisions. The book examines alternative means of estimating the size of various unobserved economies and examines their consequences in both socialist and market oriented economies. Feige goes on to develop a taxonomic framework that clarifies the distinctions between informal, illegal, unreported and unrecorded economies, and identifies their conceptual and empirical linkages and the alternative means of measuring their size and trends. Since then, the informal sector has become an increasingly popular subject of investigation in economics, sociology, anthropology and urban planning. With the turn towards so called post-fordist modes of production in the advanced developing countries, many workers were forced out of their formal sector work and into informal employment. In a 2005 collection of articles, The Informal Economy. Studies in Advanced and Less Developed Countries, the existence of an informal economy in all countries was demonstrated with case studies ranging from New York City and Madrid to Uruguay and Colombia.

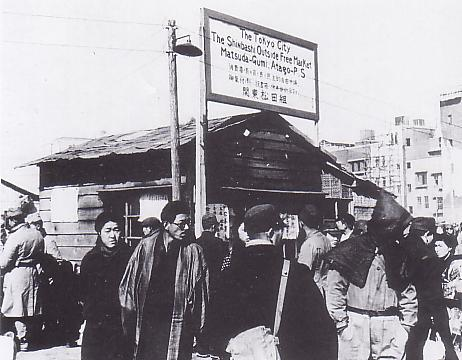
Black market in Shinbashi, Japan, 1946

An influential book on the informal economy is Hernando de Soto's El otro sendero (1986), which was published in English in 1989 as The Other Path with a preface by Peruvian writer Mario Vargas Llosa. De Soto and his team argued that excessive regulation in the Peruvian and other Latin American economies forced a large part of the economy into informality and thus prevented economic development. While accusing the ruling class of 20th century mercantilism, de Soto admired the entrepreneurial spirit of the informal economy. In a widely cited experiment, his team tried to legally register a small garment factory in Lima. This took more than 100 administrative steps and almost a year of full-time work. Feige's review of the Other Path places the work in the context of the informal economy literature. Whereas de Soto's work is popular with policymakers and champions of free market policies like The Economist, some scholars of the informal economy have criticized it both for methodological flaws and normative bias.

In the second half of the 1990s many scholars started to consciously use the term "informal economy" instead of "informal sector" to refer to a broader concept which includes enterprises as well as employment in developing, transition, and advanced industrialized economies.

Among the surveys about the size and development of the shadow economy (mostly expressed in percent of official GDP) are those by Feige (1989), and Schneider and Enste (2000) with an intensive discussion about the various estimation procedures of the size of the shadow economy as well as a critical evaluation of the size of the shadow economy and the consequences of the shadow economy on the official one. Feige's most recent survey paper on the subject from 2016 reviewed the meaning and measurement of unobserved economies and is particularly critical of estimates of the size of the so-called shadow economy which employ Multiple Indicator multiple cause methods, which treat the shadow economy as a latent variable.

== Characteristics ==
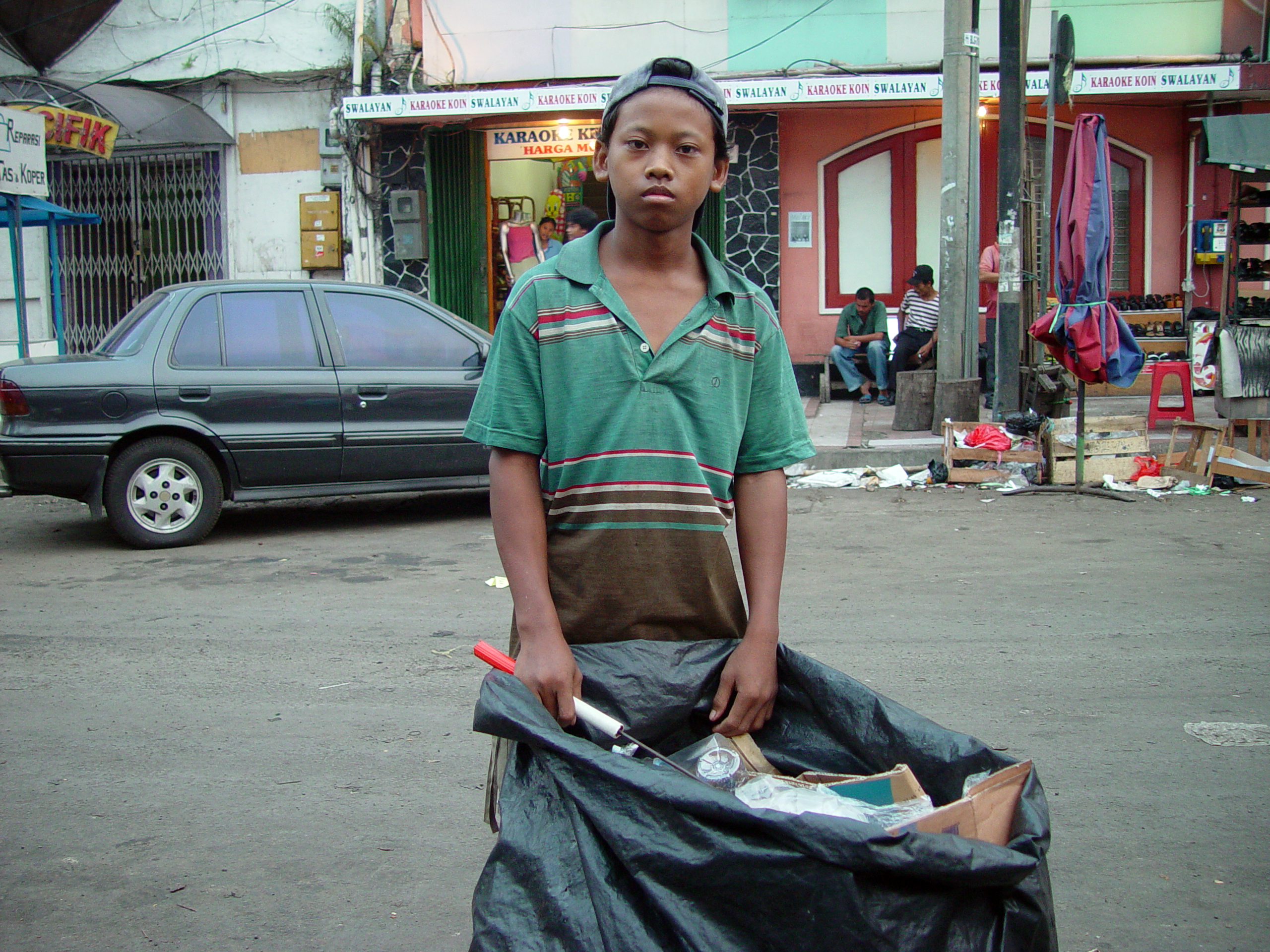
Waste picker in Indonesia

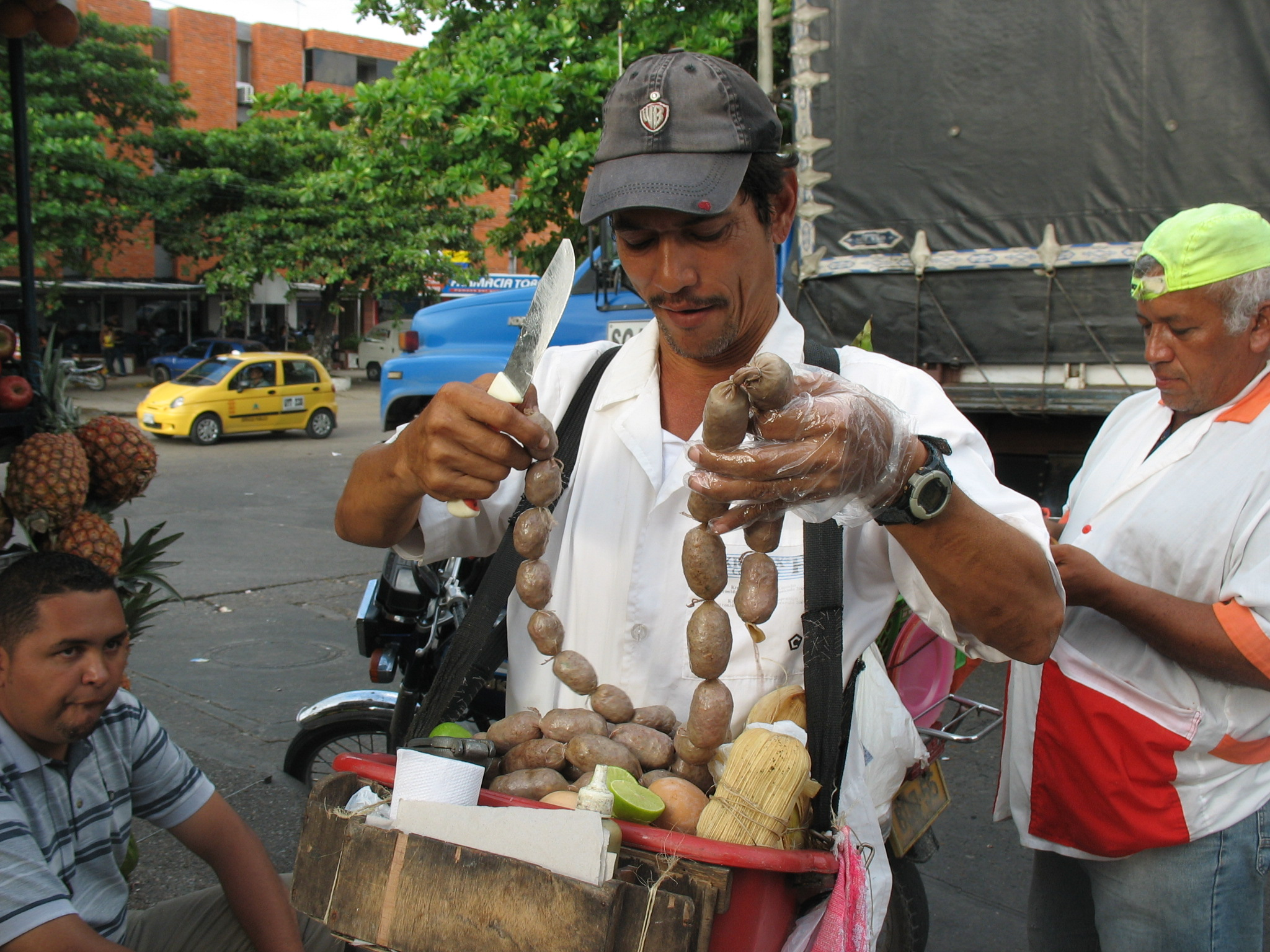
Street vendor in Colombia

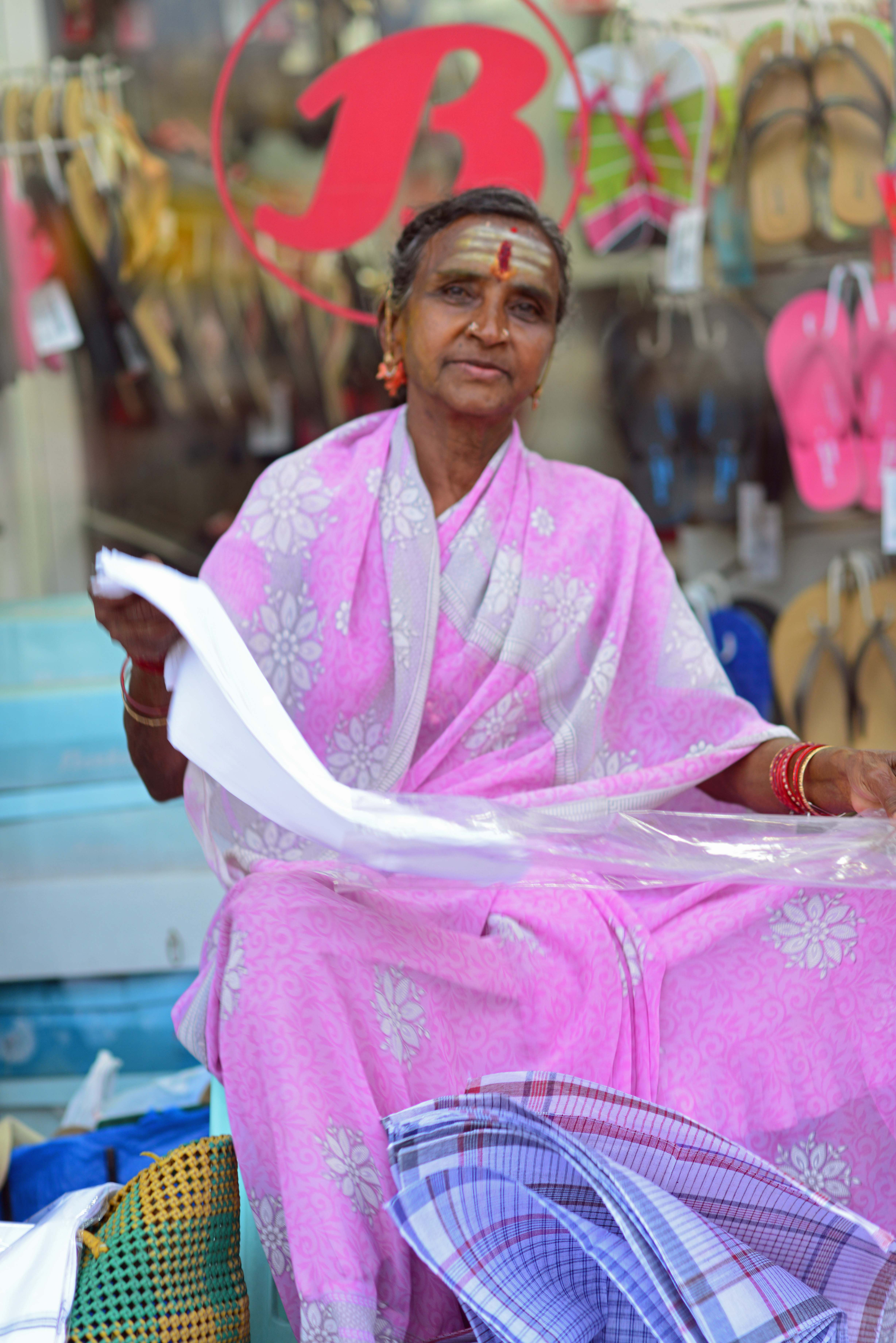
Street vendor in India

The informal sector is largely characterized by several qualities: skills gained outside of a formal education, easy entry (meaning anyone who wishes to join the sector can find some sort of work which will result in cash earnings), a lack of stable employer-employee relationships, and a small scale of operations. Workers who participate in the informal economy are typically classified as employed. The type of work that makes up the informal economy is diverse, particularly in terms of capital invested, technology used, and income generated.

The spectrum ranges from self-employment or unpaid family labor to street vendors, shoe shiners, and junk collectors. On the higher end of the spectrum are upper-tier informal activities such as small-scale service or manufacturing businesses, which have more limited entry. The upper-tier informal activities have higher set-up costs, which might include complicated licensing regulations, and irregular hours of operation. However, most workers in the informal sector, even those are self-employed or wage workers, do not have access to secure work, benefits, welfare protection, or representation. These features differ from businesses and employees in the formal sector which have regular hours of operation, a regular location and other structured benefits.

According to a 2018 study on informality in Brazil, there are three views to explain the causes of informality. The first view argues that the informal sector is a reservoir of potentially productive entrepreneurs who are kept out of formality by high regulatory costs, most notably entry regulation. The second sees informal forms as "parasitic forms" which are productive enough to survive in the formal sector but choose to remain informal to earn higher profits from the cost advantages of not complying with taxes and regulations. The third argues that informality is a survival strategy for low-skill individuals, who are too unproductive to ever become formal. According to the study the first view corresponds to 9.3 percent of all informal forms, while the second corresponds to 41.9 percent. The remaining forms correspond to low-skill entrepreneurs who are too unproductive to ever become formal. The author suggests that informal forms are to a large extent "parasitic" and therefore eradicating them (e.g., through tighter enforcement) could produce positive effects on the economy.

The most prevalent types of work in the informal economy are home-based workers and street vendors. Home-based workers are more numerous while street vendors are more visible. Combined, the two fields make up about 10–15% of the non-agricultural workforce in developing countries and over 5% of the workforce in developed countries.

While participation in the informal sector can be stigmatized, many workers engage in informal ventures by choice, for either economic or non-economic reasons. Economic motivations include the ability to evade taxes, the freedom to circumvent regulations and licensing requirements, and the capacity to maintain certain government benefits. A study of informal workers in Costa Rica illustrated other economic reasons for staying in the informal sector, as well as non-economic factors. First, they felt they would earn more money through their informal sector work than at a job in the formal economy. Second, even if workers made less money, working in the informal sector offered them more independence, the chance to select their own hours, the opportunity to work outside and near friends, etc. While jobs in the formal economy might bring more security and regularity, or even pay better, the combination of monetary and psychological rewards from working in the informal sector proves appealing for many workers.

The informal sector was historically recognized as an opposition to formal economy, meaning it included all income earning activities beyond legally regulated enterprises. However, this understanding is too inclusive and vague, and certain activities that could be included by that definition are not considered part of the informal economy. As the International Labour Organization defined the informal sector in 2002, the informal sector does not include the criminal economy. While production or employment arrangements in the informal economy may not be strictly legal, the sector produces and distributes legal goods and services. The criminal economy produces illegal goods and services. The informal economy also does not include the reproductive or care economy, which is made up of unpaid domestic work and care activities. The informal economy is part of the market economy, meaning it produces goods and services for sale and profit. Unpaid domestic work and care activities do not contribute to that, and as a result, are not a part of the informal economy.

== Statistics ==
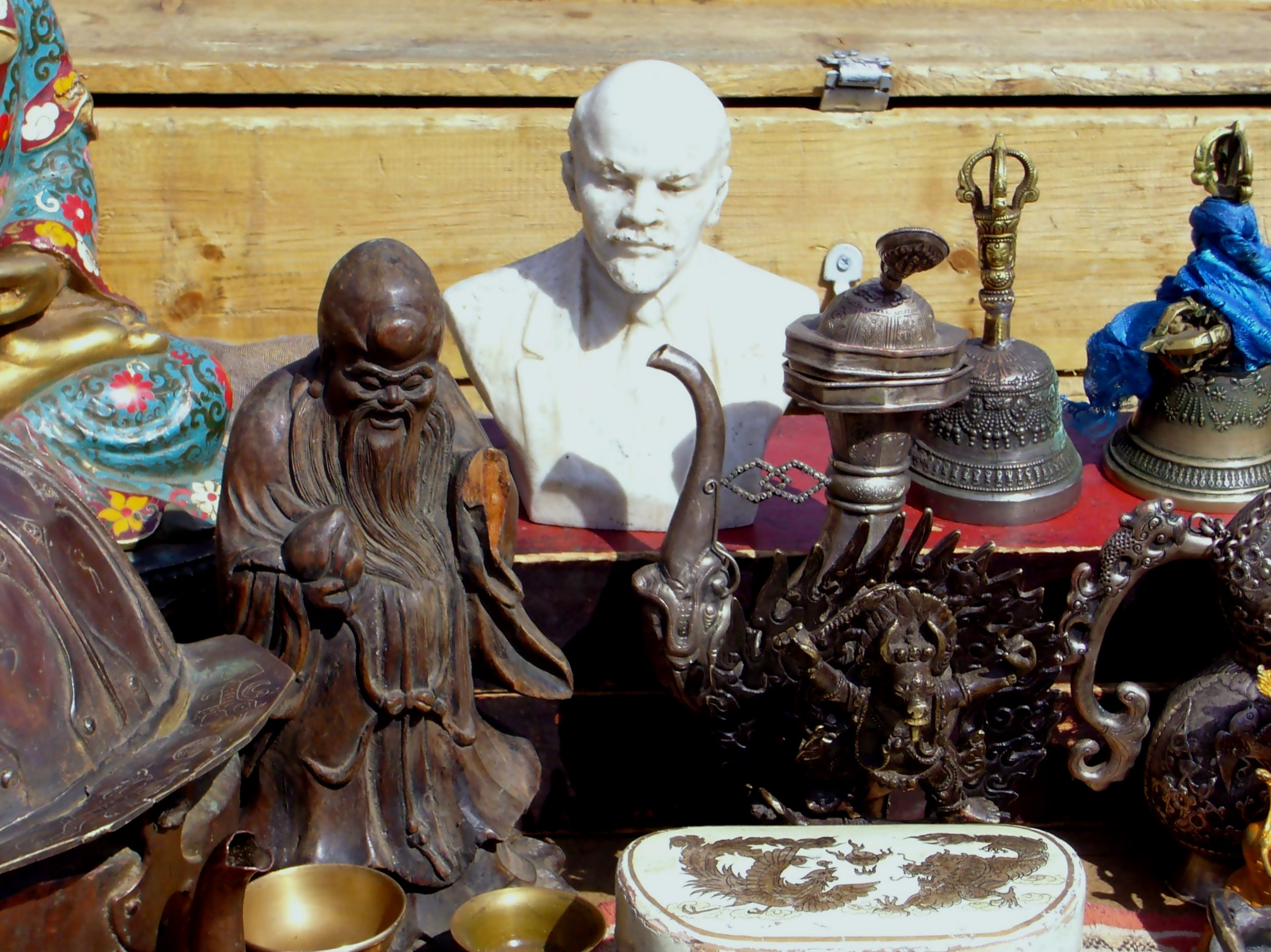
The Narantuul Market in Ulaanbaatar, Mongolia, colloquially also called Khar Zakh (Black Market)

The informal economy under any governing system is diverse and includes small-scaled, occasional members (often street vendors and garbage recyclers) as well as larger, regular enterprises (including transit systems such as that of La Paz, Bolivia). Informal economies include garment workers working from their homes, as well as informally employed personnel of formal enterprises. Employees working in the informal sector can be classified as wage workers, non-wage workers, or a combination of both.

Statistics on the informal economy are unreliable by virtue of the subject, yet they can provide a tentative picture of its relevance. For example, informal employment makes up 58.7% of non-agricultural employment in Middle East – North Africa, 64.6% in Latin America, 79.4% in Asia, and 80.4% in sub-Saharan Africa. If agricultural employment is included, the percentages rise, in some countries like India and many sub-Saharan African countries beyond 90%. Estimates for developed countries are around 15%. In recent surveys, the informal economy in many regions has declined over the past 20 years to 2014. In Africa, the share of the informal economy has decreased to an estimate of around 40% of the economy.

In developing countries, the largest part of informal work, around 70%, is self-employed. Wage employment predominates. The majority of informal economy workers are women. Policies and developments affecting the informal economy have thus a distinctly gendered effect.

=== Estimated size of countries' informal economy ===
To estimate the size and development of any underground or shadow economy is quite a challenging task since participants in such economies attempt to hide their behaviors. One must also be very careful to distinguish whether one is attempting to measure the unreported economy, normally associated with tax evasion, or the unrecorded or non-observed economy, associated with the amount of income that is readily excluded from national income and produce accounts due to the difficulty of measurement. There are numerous estimates of tax noncompliance as measured by tax gaps produced by audit methods or by "top down" methods. Friedrich Schneider and several co-authors claim to have estimated the size and trend of what they call the "shadow economy" worldwide by a currency demand MIMIC model approach that treats the "shadow economy" as a latent variable. Trevor S. Breusch has critiqued the work and warned the profession that the literature applying this model to the underground economy abounds with alarming Procrustean tendencies. Various kinds of sliding and scaling of the results are carried out in the name of "benchmarking", although these operations are not always clearly documented. The data are typically transformed in ways that are not only undeclared but have the unfortunate effect of making the results of the study sensitive to the units in which the variables are measured.

The complexity of the estimation procedure, together with its deficient documentation, leave the reader unaware of how these results have been shorted to fit the bed of prior belief. There are many other results in circulation for various countries, for which the data cannot be identified and which are given no more documentation than "own calculations by the MIMIC method". Readers are advised to adjust their valuation of these estimates accordingly.

Edgar L. Feige finds that Schneider's shadow economy "estimates suffer from conceptual flaws, apparent manipulation of results and insufficient documentation for replication, questioning their place in the academic, policy and popular literature".

=== Comparison of shadow economies in EU countries ===
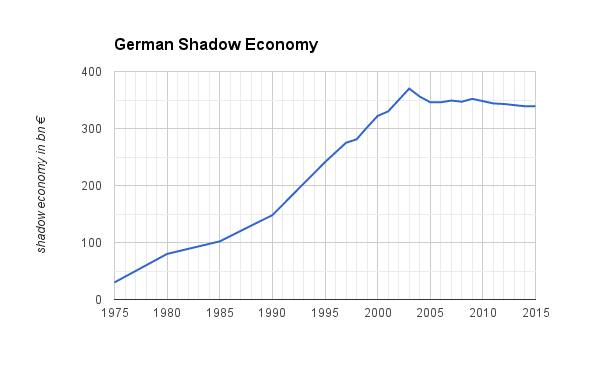
German shadow economy 1975–2015, Friedrich Schneider University Linz

As of 2013, the total EU shadow economy had been growing to about 1.9 trillion € in preparation of the EURO driven by the motor of the European shadow economy, Germany, which had been generating approx. 350 bn € per year since the establishment of the Single Market in Maastricht 1993, (see diagram on the right). Hence, the EU financial economy had developed an efficient tax haven bank system to protect and manage its growing shadow economy. As per the Financial Secrecy Index (FSI 2013) Germany and some neighbouring countries, ranked among the world's top tax haven countries.

The diagram below shows that national informal economies per capita vary only moderately in most EU countries. This is because market sectors with a high proportion of informal economy (above 45%) like the construction sector or agriculture are rather homogeneously distributed across countries, whereas sectors with a low proportion of informal economy (below 30%) like the finance and business sector (e.g. in Switzerland, Luxembourg), the public service and personal Service Sector (as in Scandinavian countries) as well as the retail industry, wholesale and repair sector are dominant in countries with extremely high GDP per capita i.e. industrially highly developed countries. The diagram also shows that in absolute numbers the shadow economy per capita is related to the wealth of a society (GDP). Generally spoken, the higher the GDP the higher the shadow economy, albeit non-proportional.

There is a direct relationship between high self-employment of a country to its above average shadow economy. In highly industrialized countries where shadow economy (per capita) is high and the huge private sector is shared by an extremely small elite of entrepreneurs a considerable part of tax evasion is practised by a much smaller number of (elite) people. As an example German shadow economy in 2013 was €4.400 per capita, which was the 9th highest place in EU, whereas according to OECD only 11.2% of employed people were self-employed (place 18). On the other hand, Greece's shadow economy was only €3.900 p.c (place 13) but self-employment was 36.9% (place 1).

An extreme example of shadow economy camouflaged by the financial market is Luxembourg where the relative annual shadow economy is only 8% of the GDP which is the second lowest percentage (2013) of all EU countries whereas its absolute size (€6.800 per capita) is the highest.

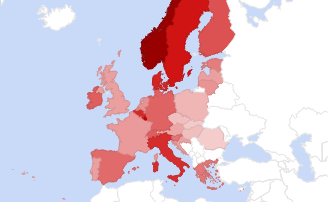
Map of the national shadow economies per capita in EU countries. The red scale represents the numbers displayed by the red bars of the diagram on the left.

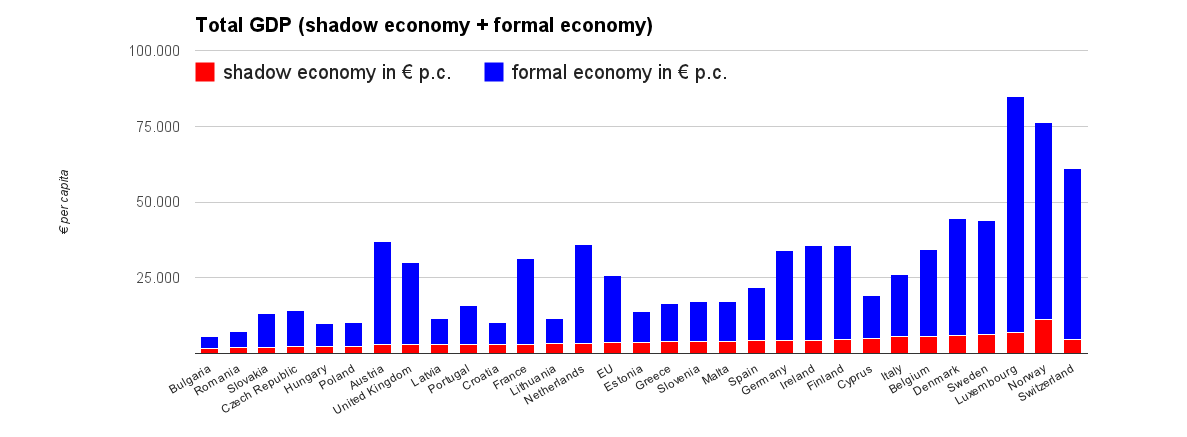

== Social and political implications and issues ==
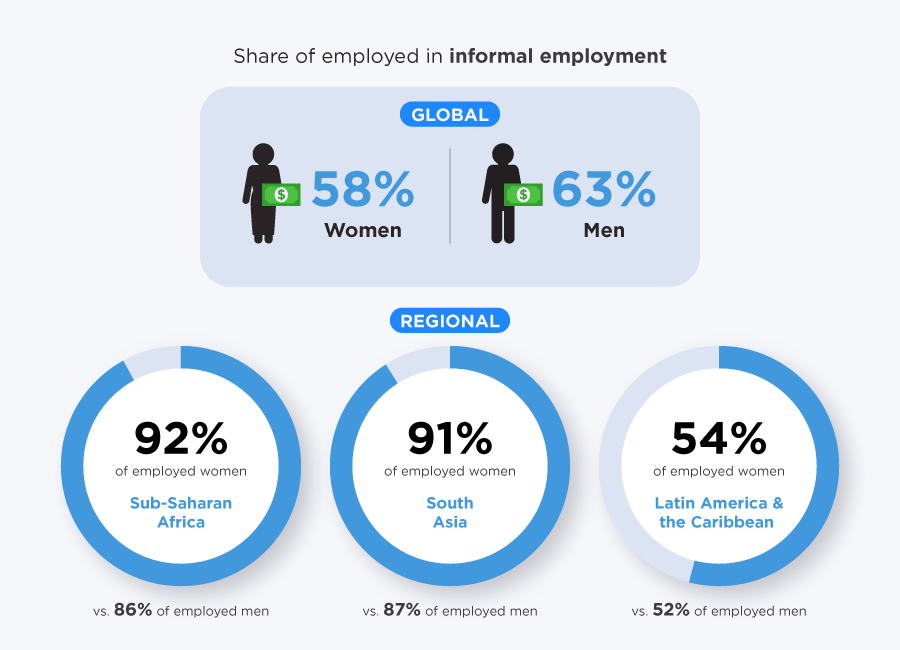
Share of employed in informal employment by gender

According to development and transition theories, workers in the informal sector typically earn less income, have unstable income, and do not have access to basic protections and services. The informal economy is also much larger than most people realize, with women playing a huge role. The working poor, particularly women, are concentrated in the informal economy, and most low-income households rely on the sector to provide for them. However, informal businesses can also lack the potential for growth, trapping employees in menial jobs indefinitely. On the other hand, the informal sector can allow a large proportion of the population to escape extreme poverty and earn an income that is satisfactory for survival. Also, in developed countries, some people who are formally employed may choose to perform part of their work outside of the formal economy, exactly because it delivers them more advantages. This is called 'moonlighting'. They derive social protection, pension and child benefits and the like, from their formal employment, and at the same time have tax and other advantages from working on the side.

From the viewpoint of governments, the informal sector can create a vicious cycle. Being unable to collect taxes from the informal sector, the government may be hindered in financing public services, which in turn makes the sector more attractive. Conversely, some governments view informality as a benefit, enabling excess labor to be absorbed, and mitigating unemployment issues. Recognizing that the informal economy can produce significant goods and services, create necessary jobs, and contribute to imports and exports is critical for governments.

As the work in informal sector is not monitored or registered with the state, its workers are not entitled to social security, and they face unique challenges when affiliated in or creating trade unions. Informal economy workers are more likely to work long hours than workers in the formal economy who are protected by employment laws and regulations. A landmark study conducted by the World Health Organization and the International Labour Organization found that exposure to long working hours caused an estimated 745,000 fatalities from ischemic heart disease and stroke events in 2016. A systematic review and meta-analysis of health services use and health outcomes among informal economy workers, when compared with formal economy workers, found that these workers are less likely to use health services and more likely to have depression, highlighting their substantial health disadvantage.

=== Gender ===
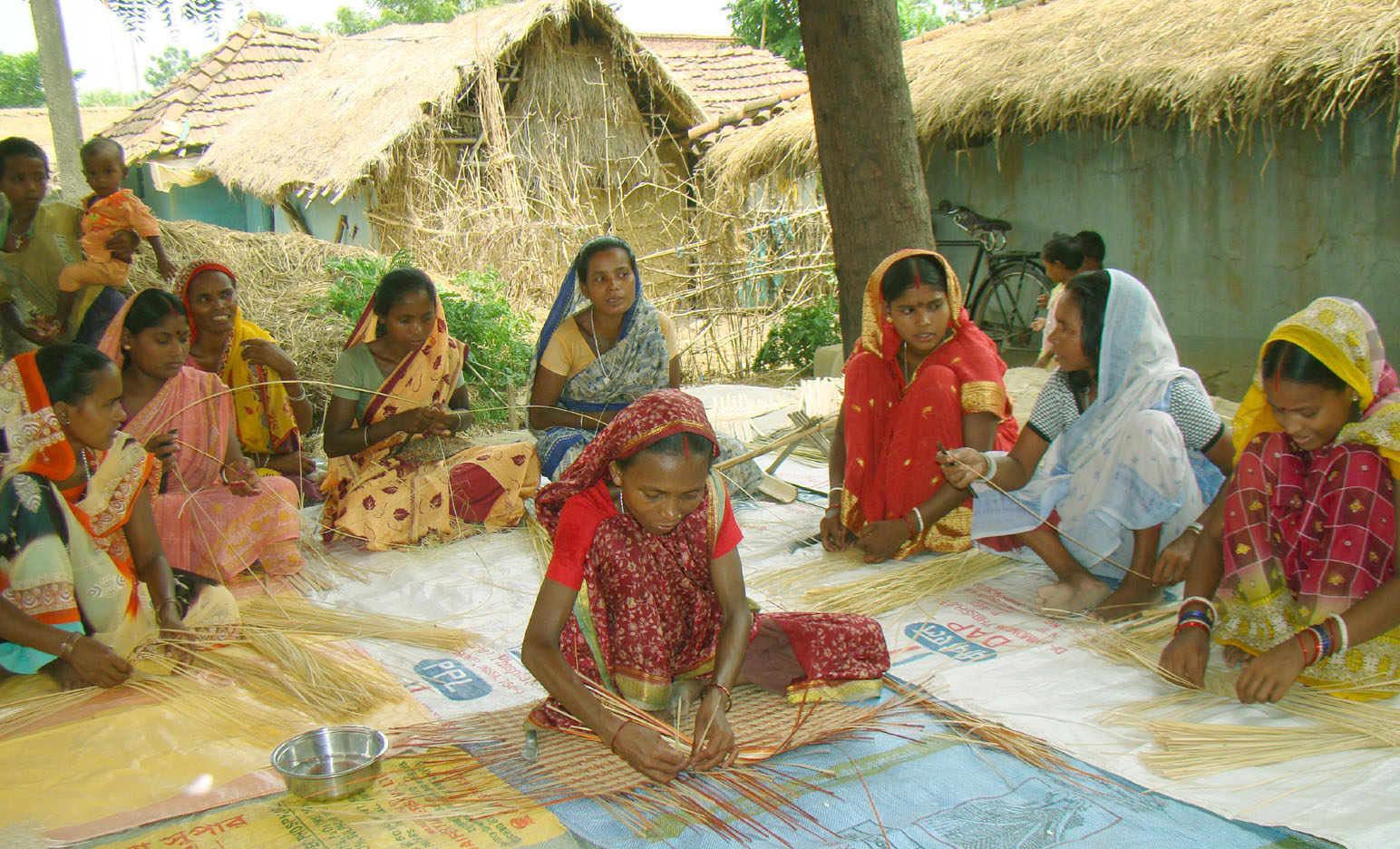
A group of Indian women making bamboo products they intend to sell in Dumka, Jharkhand

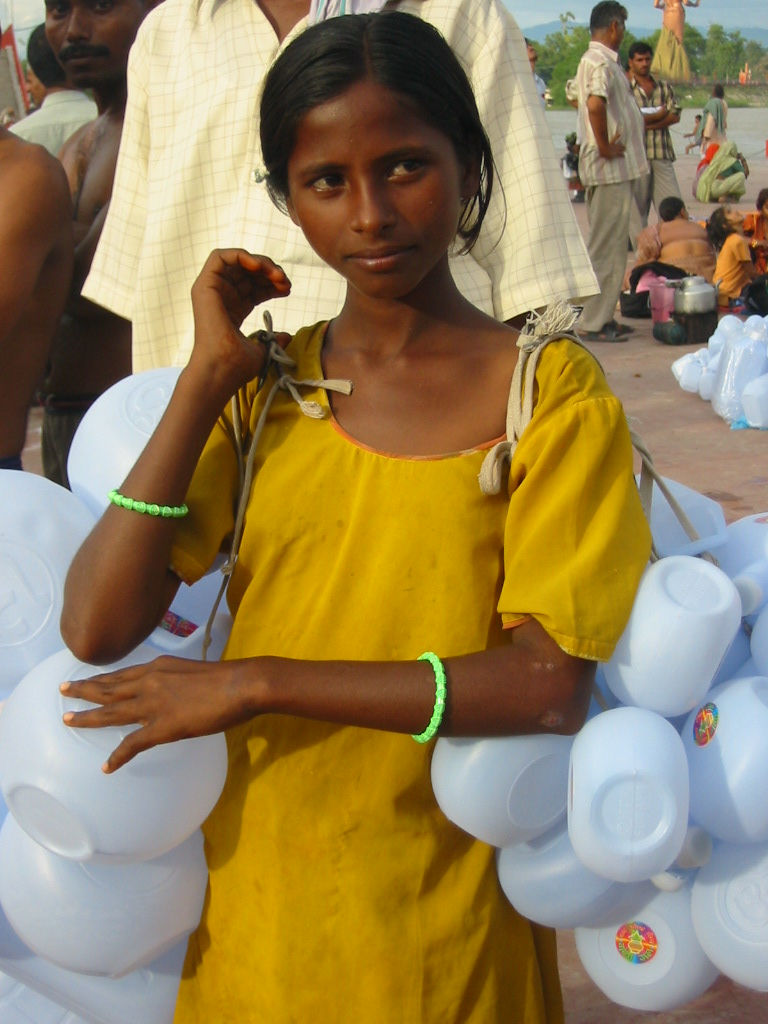
A girl selling plastic containers for carrying Ganges water, Haridwar, India

In developing countries, most of the female non-agricultural labor force is in the informal sector. Female representation in the informal sector is attributed to a variety of factors. One such factor is that employment in the informal sector is the source of employment that is most readily available to women. A 2011 study of poverty in Bangladesh noted that cultural norms, religious seclusion, and illiteracy among women in many developing countries, along with a greater commitment to family responsibilities, prevent women from entering the formal sector.

Major occupations in the informal sector include home-based workers (such as dependent subcontract workers, independent own account producers, and unpaid workers in family businesses) and street vendors, which both are classified in the informal sector. Women tend to make up the greatest portion of the informal sector, often ending up in the most erratic and corrupt segments of the sector. In India, women working in the informal sector often work as ragpickers, domestic workers, coolies, vendors, beauticians, construction laborers, and garment workers.

According to a 2002 study commissioned by the ILO, the connection between employment in the informal economy and being poor is stronger for women than men. While men tend to be over-represented in the top segment of the informal sector, women overpopulate the bottom segment. Men are more likely to have larger-scale operations and deal in non-perishable items while few women are employers who hire others. Instead, women are more likely to be involved in smaller-scale operations and trade food items. Women are under-represented in higher-income employment positions in the informal economy and over-represented in lower-income statuses. As a result, the gender gap in terms of wage is higher in the informal sector than the formal sector. Labor markets, household decisions, and states all propagate this gender inequality.

=== Political power of agents ===
Workers in the informal economy lack a significant voice in government policy. Not only is the political power of informal workers limited, but the existence of the informal economy creates challenges for other politically influential actors. For example, the trade unions struggle to organize the informal economy and often formal workers organized in unions have no immediate interest in improving the status of informal workers due to fears of status loss. Yet the informal economy negatively affects membership and investment in the trade unions. Laborers who might be formally employed and join a union for protection may choose to branch out on their own instead. While this hostile attitude is not always the case, the nature of informal employment - low and irregular income that is not enough to pay union dues, fast-changing decentralized work locations and a self-perception of informal workers as self-employed pose barriers to informal economy trade union organizing. As a result, trade unions are inclined to oppose the informal sector, highlighting the costs and disadvantages of the system. Producers in the formal sector can similarly feel threatened by the informal economy. The flexibility of production, low labor and production costs, and bureaucratic freedom of the informal economy can be seen as consequential competition for formal producers, leading them to challenge and object to that sector. Last, the nature of the informal economy is largely anti-regulation and free of standard taxes, which diminishes the material and political power of government agents. Whatever the significance of these concerns are, the informal sector can shift political power and energies.

=== Poverty ===
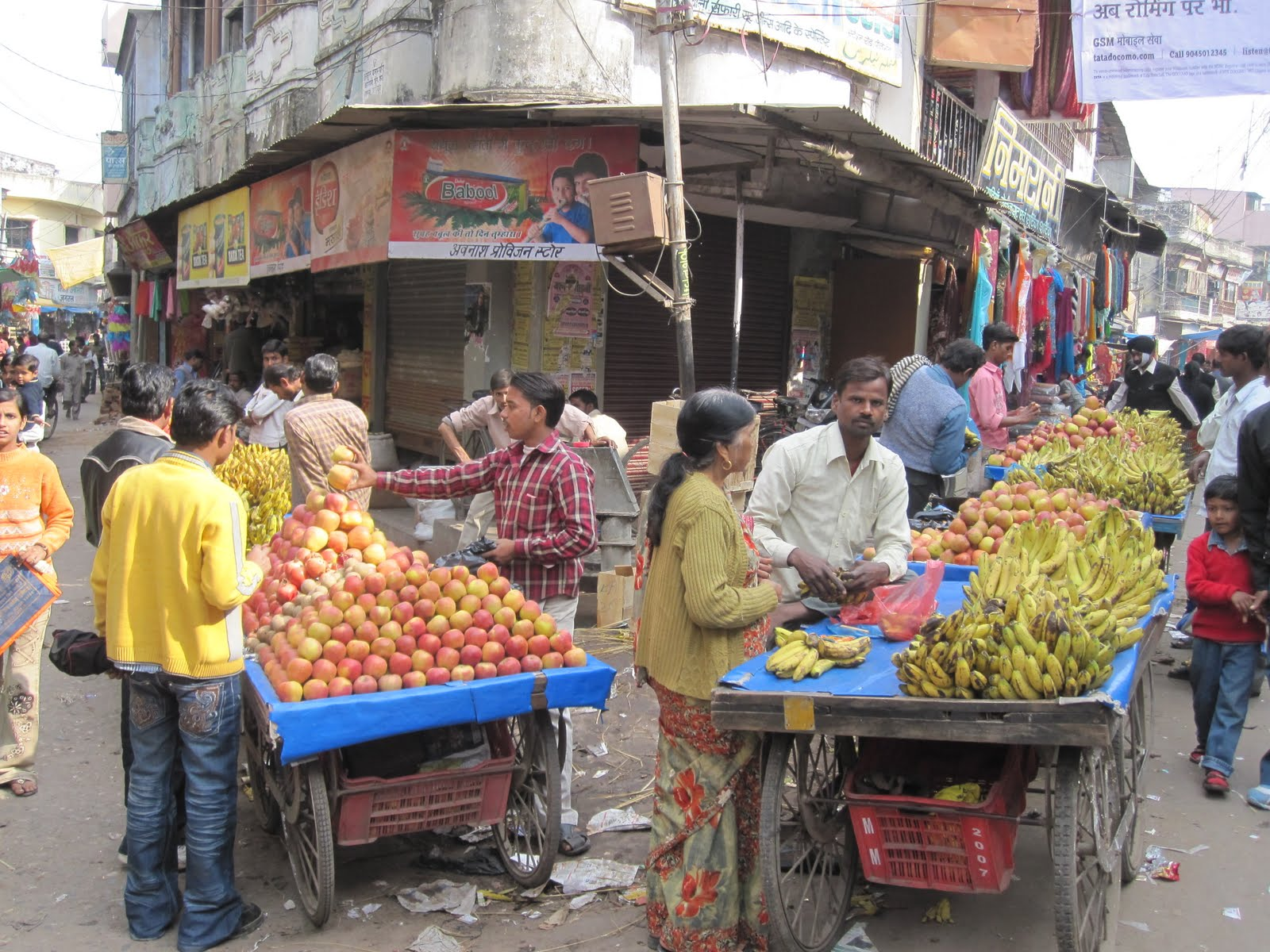
Informal vendors in Uttar Pradesh

The relationship between the informal sectors and poverty certainly is not simple nor does a clear, causal relationship exist. An inverse relationship between an increased informal sector and slower economic growth has been observed though. Average incomes are substantially lower in the informal economy and there is a higher preponderance of impoverished employees working in the informal sector. In addition, workers in the informal economy are less likely to benefit from employment benefits and social protection programs. For instance, a survey in Europe shows that the respondents who have difficulties to pay their household bills have worked informally more often in the past year than those that do not (10% versus 3% of the respondents).

=== Children and child labour ===
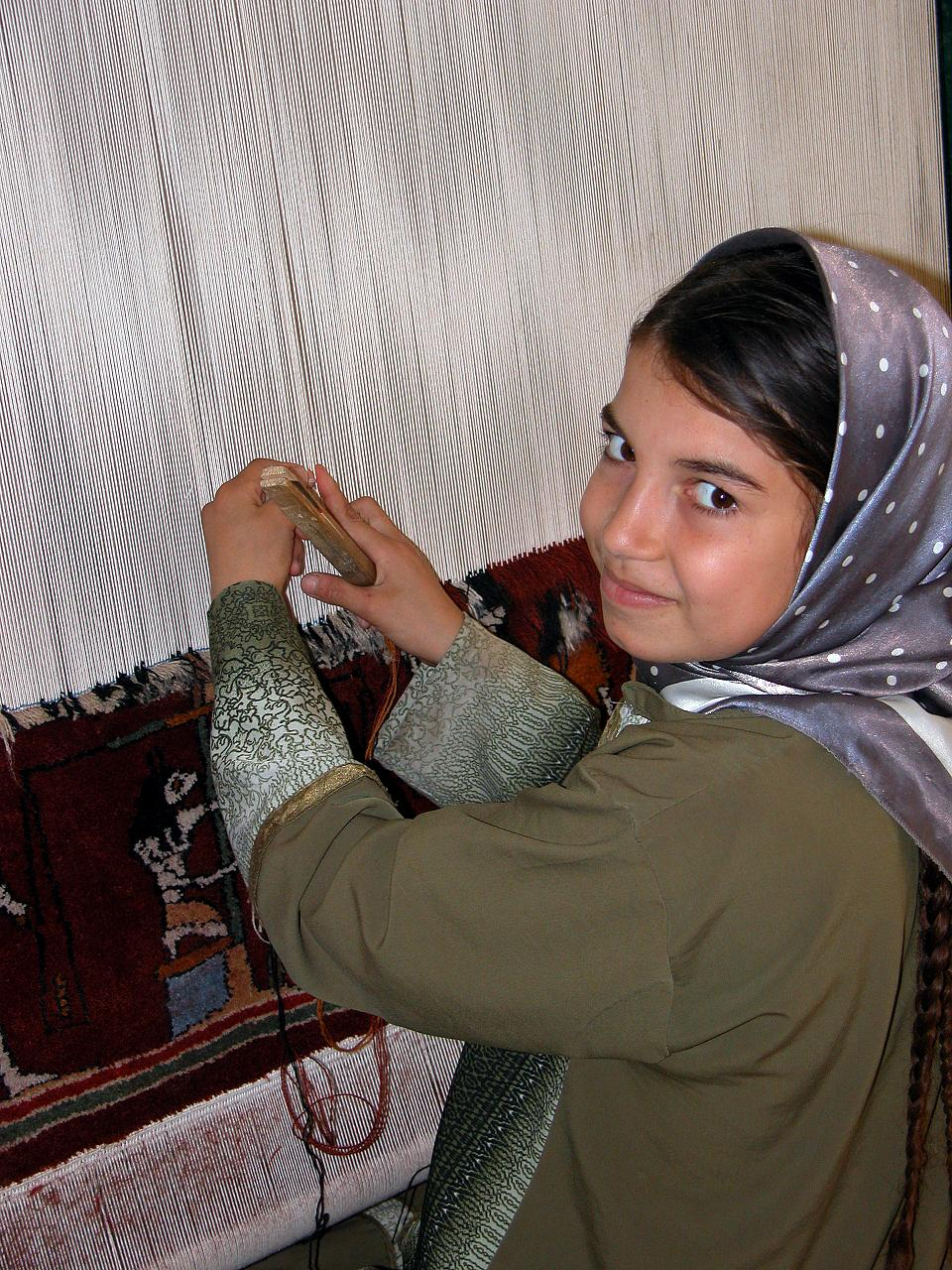
A girl weaving a rug in Egypt

Children work in the informal economy in many parts of the world. They often work as scavengers (collecting recyclables from the streets and dump sites), day laborers, cleaners, construction workers, vendors, in seasonal activities, domestic workers, and in small workshops; and often work under hazardous and exploitative conditions. It is common for children to work as domestic servants in parts of Latin America and parts of Asia. Such children are very vulnerable to exploitation: often they are not allowed to take breaks or are required to work long hours; many suffer from a lack of access to education, which can contribute to social isolation and a lack of future opportunity. UNICEF considers domestic work to be among the lowest status, and reports that most child domestic workers are live-in workers and are under the round-the-clock control of their employers. Some estimates suggest that among girls, domestic work is the most common form of employment.

During times of economic crisis, many families experience unemployment and job loss, compelling adolescents to supplement their parents' income by selling goods or services and contributing to the family economy. As a result, young people may have to compromise their social activities with other youth and instead prioritize participation in the informal economy, creating a labour class of adolescents who take on adult roles within the family. Although participation in the informal economy carries a negative stigma of deviance, for many individuals, particularly people of colour, it is not an ideal choice but a necessity for survival. Participation in the informal economy is becoming normalized due to the lack of resources available in low-income and marginalized communities. Despite their efforts, those involved may have limited opportunities for upward economic mobility. When a parent is unemployed or their work is in low demand, they may seek alternative means of providing for themselves and, particularly, their children. Due to limited employment opportunities, children may eventually cooperate with their parents by working to support their family's economic well-being. By helping to provide for their families, children may miss out on aspects of childhood, as they are unable to participate in activities enjoyed by other young people their age and are instead required to assume adult responsibilities and contribute to the family's well-being

The participation of adolescents in the informal economy, is a contentious issue due to the restrictions and laws in place for youth have to work. One of the main dilemmas that arise when children engage in this type of work, is that privileged adults, denounce children participation as forced labor. Due to the participant being young, the adults are viewed as "bad" parents because first they cannot provide for their children, second they are stripping the child from a "normal" childhood, and third, child labor is frowned upon. Furthermore, certain people believe that children should not be working because children do not know the risks and the pressure of working and having so much responsibility, but the reality is that for most families, the children are not being forced to work, rather they choose to help sustain their family's income. The youth become forced by their circumstances, meaning that because of their conditions, they do not have much of a choice. Youth have the capability to acknowledge their family's financial limitations and many feel that it is their moral obligation to contribute to the family income. Thus, they end up working without asking for an allowance or wage, because kids recognize that their parents cannot bring home enough income alone, thus their contribution is necessary and their involvement becomes instrumental for their family's economic survival.

Emir Estrada and Pierrette Hondagneu-Sotelo have gone to predominantly Latino communities of Los Angeles, CA. to observe the daily actions of street vendors. They analyze why adults participate in the informal economy. Although it revolves around a negative stigma of deviance, for a majority of individuals, the informal economy is not an ideal choice but an action necessary for survival. While witnessing the constant struggle of Latino individuals to make ends meet and trying to earn money to put food on the table, they witnessed how the participation of children either benefits the family or even hurt it. Through field notes derived from their participation, Estrada states, "children are not the 'baggage' that adult immigrants simply bring along. In the case of street vendors, we see that they are also contributors to family processes". Estrada's findings demonstrate that children are working in order to help contribute to their household income, but most importantly, they play a vital role when it comes to language barriers. The kids are not simply workers, they achieve an understanding of how to manage a business and commerce.

== Expansion and growth ==
The division of the economy into formal and informal sectors has a long heritage. Arthur Lewis in his seminal work Economic Development with Unlimited Supply of Labour, published in the 1950s, was the celebrated paradigm of development for the newly independent countries in the 1950s and 1960s. The model assumed that the unorganized sector with the surplus labour will gradually disappear as the surplus labour gets absorbed in the organised sector. The Lewis model is drawn from the experience of capitalist countries in which the share of agriculture and unorganized sector showed a spectacular decline, but it didn't prove to be true in many developing countries, including India. On the other hand, probabilistic migration models developed by Harris and Todaro in the 1970s envisaged the phenomenon of the informal sector as a transitional phase through which migrants move to the urban centers before shifting to formal sector employment. Hence it is not a surprise to see policy invisibility in the informal sector. Curiously, the informal sector does not find a permanent place in the Marxian theory since they anticipate the destruction of the pre-capitalist structure as a result of the aggressive growth of capitalism. To them, in the course of development, 'the small fish is being eaten by the big fish'. Therefore, neither in the Marxian theory nor in the classical economic theory, the unorganized sector holds a permanent place in the economic literature.

The informal sector has been expanding as more economies have started to liberalize. This pattern of expansion began in the 1960s when a lot of developing countries didn't create enough formal jobs in their economic development plans, which led to the formation of an informal sector that didn't solely include marginal work and actually contained profitable opportunities. In the 1980s, the sector grew alongside formal industrial sectors. In the 1990s, an increase in global communication and competition led to a restructuring of production and distribution, often relying more heavily on the informal sector.

Over the past decade, the informal economy is said to account for more than half of the newly created jobs in Latin America. In Africa it accounts for around eighty percent. Many explanations exist as to why the informal sector has been expanding in the developing world throughout the past few decades. It is possible that the kind of development that has been occurring has failed to support the increased labor force in a formal manner. Expansion can also be explained by the increased subcontracting due to globalization and economic liberalization. Finally, employers could be turning toward the informal sector to lower costs and cope with increased competition.

Such extreme competition between industrial countries occurred after the expansion of the EC to markets of the then new member countries Greece, Spain and Portugal, and particularly after the establishment of the Single European Market (1993, Treaty of Maastricht). Mainly for French and German corporations it led to systematic increase of their informal sectors under liberalized tax laws, thus fostering their mutual competitiveness and against small local competitors. The continuous systematic increase of the German informal sector was stopped only after the establishment of the EURO and the execution of the Summer Olympic Games 2004, which has been the first and (up to now) only in the Single Market. Since then the German informal sector stabilized on the achieved 350 bn € level which signifies an extremely high tax evasion for a country with 90% salary-employment.

According to the Swedish International Development Cooperation Agency (SIDA), the key drivers for the growth of the informal economy in the twenty-first century include:

- limited absorption of labour, particularly in countries with high rates of population or urbanisation
- excessive cost and regulatory barriers of entry into the formal economy, often motivated by corruption
- weak institutions, limiting education and training opportunities as well as infrastructure development
- increasing demand for low-cost goods and services
- migration motivated by economic hardship and poverty
- difficulties faced by women in gaining formal employment

Historically, development theories have asserted that as economies mature and develop, economic activity will shift from the informal to the formal sphere. In fact, much of the economic development discourse is centered around the notion that formalization indicates how developed a country's economy is; for more on this discussion see the page on fiscal capacity. However, evidence suggests that the progression from informal to formal sectors is not universally applicable. While the characteristics of a formalized economy – full employment and an extensive welfare system – have served as effective methods of organizing work and welfare for some nations, such a structure is not necessarily inevitable or ideal. Indeed, development appears to be heterogeneous in different localities, regions, and nations, as well as the type of work practiced. For example, at one end of the spectrum of the type of work practiced in the informal economy are small-scale businesses and manufacturing; on the other "street vendors, shoe shiners, junk collectors and domestic servants." Regardless of how the informal economy develops, its continued growth that it cannot be considered a temporary phenomenon.

== Policy suggestions ==
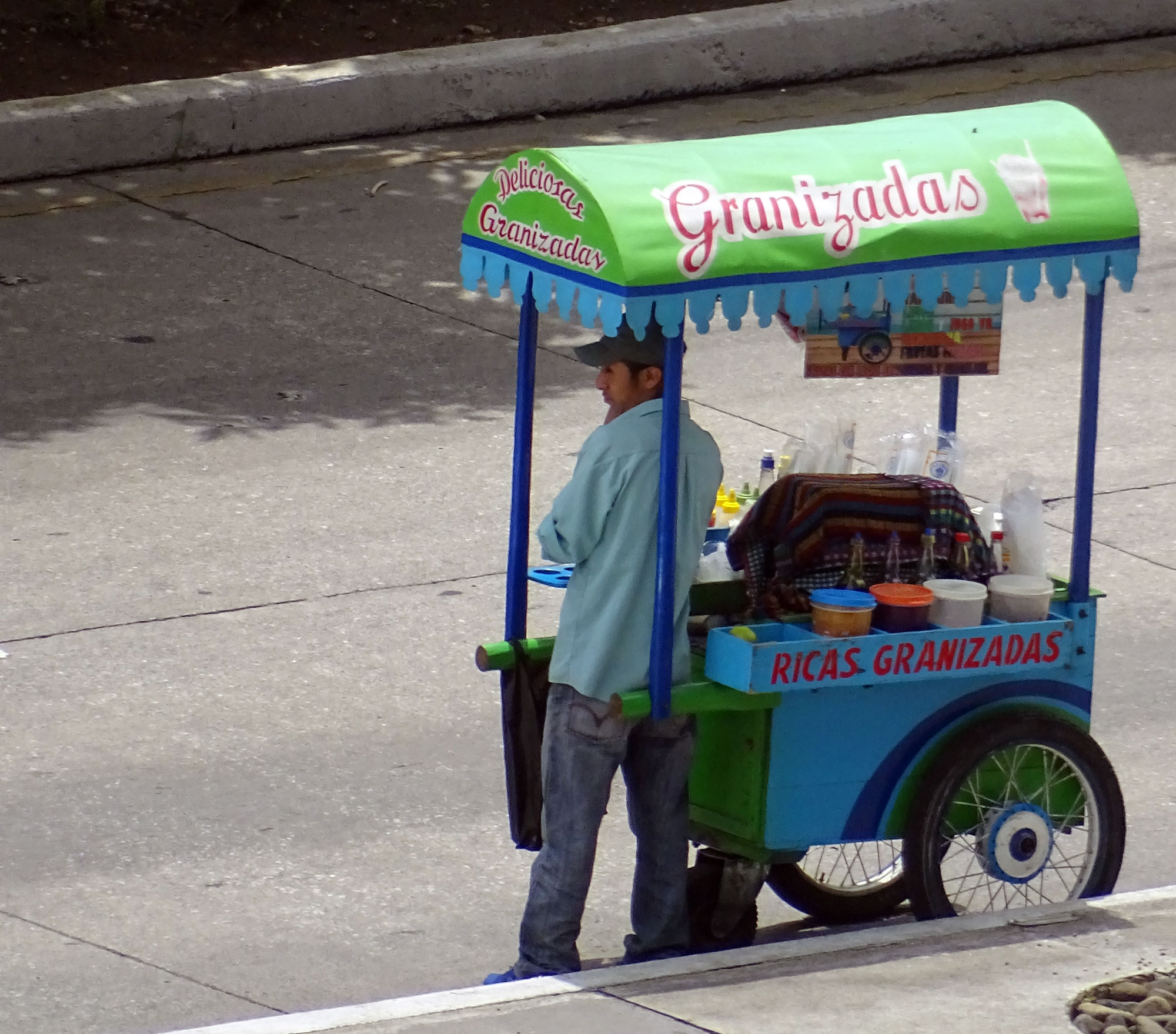
Informal beverage vendor in Guatemala City

As it has been historically stigmatized, policy perspectives viewed the informal sector as disruptive to the national economy and a hindrance to development. The justifications for such criticisms include the perception that the informal economy involves fraudulent activities that result in tax revenue losses, weaken trade unions, create unfair competition, reduce government regulatory control, undermine compliance with health and safety standards, and limit the availability of employment benefits and rights. These characteristics have led many nations to pursue deterrence policies through strict regulation and punitive measures.

In a 2004 report, the Department for Infrastructure and Economic Cooperation under SIDA explained three perspectives on the role of government and policy in relation to the informal economy.

- Markets function efficiently on their own; government interference would only lead to inefficiency and dysfunction.
- The informal economy functions outside of government control, largely because those who participate wish to avoid regulation and taxation.
- The informal economy is enduring; suitable regulation and policies are required.

As informal economy has significant job creation and income generation potential, as well as the capacity to meet the needs of poor consumers by providing cheaper and more accessible goods and services, many stakeholders subscribe to the third perspective and support government intervention and accommodation. Embedded in the third perspective is the significant expectation that governments will revise policies that have favored the formal sphere at the expense of the informal sector.

Theories of how to accommodate the informal economy argue for government policies that, recognizing the value and importance of the informal sector, regulate and restrict when necessary but generally work to improve working conditions and increase efficiency and production.

The challenge for policy interventions is that so many different types of informal work exist; a solution would have to provide for a diverse range of circumstances. A possible strategy would be to provide better protections and benefits to informal sector players. However, such programs could lead to a disconnect between the labor market and protections, which would not actually improve informal employment conditions. In a 2014 report monitoring street vending, WIEGO suggested urban planners and local economic development strategists study the carrying capacity of areas regularly used by informal workers and deliver the urban infrastructure necessary to support the informal economy, including running water and toilets, street lights and regular electricity, and adequate shelter and storage facilities. That study also called for basic legal rights and protections for informal workers, such as appropriate licensing and permit practices.

An ongoing policy debate considers the value of government tax breaks for household services such as cleaning, babysitting and home maintenance, with an aim to reduce the shadow economy's impact. There are currently systems in place in Sweden and France which offer 50 percent tax breaks for home cleaning services. There has also been debate in the UK about introducing a similar scheme, with potentially large savings for middle-class families and greater incentive for women to return to work after having children. The European Union has used political measures to try to curb the shadow economy. Although no definitive solution has been established, the EU council has led dialogue on a platform that would combat undeclared work.

The World Bank's 2019 World Development Report on The Changing Nature of Work discusses the extension of social assistance and insurance schemes to informal workers given that, in 2018, 8 in 10 people in developing countries still receive no social assistance and 6 in 10 work informally.

A 2026 OECD report found that, on average, 68% of workers over 15 in the countries covered by its informality database were informally employed, counting each country equally. In 34 of the 58 countries it compared by gender, women were more likely than men to hold an informal job.

== Asia-Pacific ==
The International Labour Organization mentioned that in most developing nations located in the Asia-Pacific, the informal sector comprises a significant and vital percentage of the labor force. This sector constitutes around 60 percent of the labor force. Informal economy includes economic activities of laborers (legally and in practice) which are not or inadequately covered by official employment contracts or agreements. Informal employment means payment of wages may not be guaranteed and retrenchment can be implemented without prior notice or compensation from employers. There are generally substandard health and safety conditions as well as nonexistence of social benefits which include sick pay, pension, and health coverage. The informal economy absorbs a larger part of the ever-growing workforce in urban hubs. In 2015, urban populations of Asian countries started to grow while the service sector also continued to increase. These developments contributed to the extensive expansion of urban informal economy in practically all of Asia.

In China, as in other developing countries, informal employment is widespread. According to the National Bureau of Statistics (NBS), there were approximately 277 million migrant workers in China. Their average monthly income was about 3,000 yuan, compared with an average monthly wage of approximately 5,169 yuan in the formal economy in 2015. More than 80 percent of these workers worked overtime, and fewer than 40 percent had labour contracts. These figures indicate that a large proportion of migrant workers were engaged in informal employment. Informal employment in China has undergone significant changes over the past several decades. During much of the Maoist period, the informal economy was limited because most urban residents held formal jobs in state-owned or collectively owned enterprises. According to a 2006 study, only 0.16 percent of the urban employed population belonged to the informal economy in 1978. Following China's economic reforms and urbanization, the informal economy expanded.

Research using the Multiple Indicators Multiple Causes (MIMIC) model estimated that the informal economy accounted for approximately 20.55 percent of China's gross domestic product (GDP) in 2017, with an estimated 159 million people engaged in informal employment. A separate study estimated that the informal economy accounted for 23.5 percent of GDP in 2018, representing an output value of approximately 21.16 trillion yuan.

The growth of digital platforms has also influenced informal economic activity in China. E-commerce platforms such as Alibaba's Taobao have enabled unregistered businesses to reach consumers through online marketplaces and establish reputations through customer ratings and reviews. Digital financial services, including Alipay, have provided alternative channels for small businesses to access credit through transaction histories, reducing some of the financial barriers associated with formal business registration.

In India, the country's informal sector accounted for over 80 percent of the non-agricultural industry during the last 20 years. Inadequate employment denotes the option for majority of India's citizens is to find work in the informal sector which continues to grow because of the contract system and outsourcing of production. An article in First Post (June 2018) said approximately 1.3 billion people or more than 68 percent of employed persons in the Asia-Pacific earn through the informal economy. It is prevalent in the countryside (around 85 percent) and almost 48 percent in urban locations. 2 billion of the global population (61 percent) works in the informal sector. According to an article published in Eco-Business in June 2018, the informal sector has emerged as an essential component of the economic environment of cities in this region. Henceforth, the importance of contribution of informal workers deserves recognition. For a more detailed overview focused on informal employment in South Asian countries, see Informal economy of South Asia.

== Iconography ==
The triptych La familia informal (The Informal Family, 1992) by painter Herman Braun-Vega, held in the permanent collection of the Ralli Museum in Marbella, explores the theme of the informal economy. Created as part of a series of sixteen paintings on syncretism and mestizaje (racial and cultural mixing) for a retrospective exhibition in Madrid in 1992 during the celebrations of the fifth centenary of the Encounter of Two Worlds, this triptych associates the informal economy in developing countries – defined by the artist as "an economic system linked to survival, autonomous from the State and escaping taxation" – with a reflection on mestizaje and social integration.

Drawing inspiration from the architectural structure of Velázquez's Las Meninas, Braun-Vega depicts "popular characters from the informal economy" alongside members of his family and artistic and literary figures, constituting what he calls an "informal family". The work was used in an educational program by the French Ministry of Education, Culture and Francophonie during the 1994-1995 school year, where it was presented in thirteen schools as educational material on subsistence economies and cultural exchange between peoples.

== See also ==
- Agorism
- Casual employment
- Counter-economics
- Doing business as
- Flea market
- Gig economy
- Informal housing
- Legal personality, a requirement for legitimate businesses
- Precariat
- Rotating Savings and Credit Association
- Substantivism
- System D
- Virtual economy
