= BMA Tower =

- U.S. National Register of Historic Places
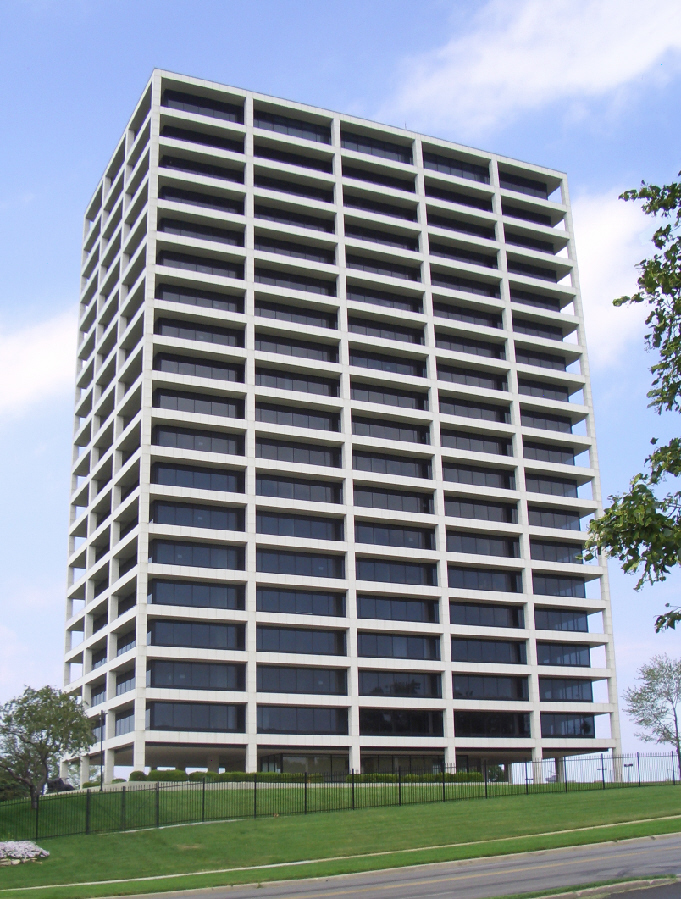

- Location within Missouri Location within the United States
- Location: 700 W 31st Street., Kansas City, Missouri
- Coordinates: 39°4′26″N 94°35′35″W
- Built: 1961
- Architect: Skidmore Owings & Merrill; et al.
- Architectural style: International Style
- NRHP reference No.: 02000886
- Added to NRHP: August 21, 2002

The BMA Tower is a building in Kansas City, Missouri. Also known as One Park Place, it was built as a 19-story Modern style office building. Located at a prominent height 3 miles (4.8 km) south of downtown Kansas City, the 280-foot-tall (85 m) building is uniquely visible. The building was planned for the Business Men's Assurance Company of America, an insurance company, on the site of the former St. Joseph's Orphanage. The building was designed by Skidmore, Owings & Merrill with steel-frame construction and clad in a contrasting grid of deeply inset black glass and white marble. It was the first high-rise structure in Kansas City since the building of City Hall in 1936, and opened in 1963.

Designed by SOM project manager Bruce Graham, who later was lead architect for the John Hancock Center and the Willis Tower, the BMA Tower is completely devoid of ornament, using only the contrast between the white cladding on the columns and beams with the black glazing as expression. In design it is closely related to the First City National Bank Building in Houston, designed by Gordon Bunshaft, another SOM partner. Even more than the upper-floor windows, the ground floor is deeply inset, with glass surrounding just the central building core to function as a lobby. The structure encloses 384,000 square feet (35,700 m^{2}).

The building's original marble cladding was replaced after several panels fell from the building in 1985 and 1986. The problem was traced to the thinness of the panels (1.25 inches (3.2 cm) and the method of anchorage to the frame. As a result of extensive investigation, the panels were replaced with neoparium, a glass product that appeared indistinguishable from marble at more than 100 feet (30 m). This failure mode was not uncommon in buildings of this era that employed thin marble cladding. Several buildings, most notably the Aon Center in Chicago were re-clad with materials other than marble.

The BMA Building won an Architectural Award of Excellence from the American Institute of Steel Construction and a First Honor Award from the American Institute of Architects.

The building was sold by the BMA in 2002 and was added to the National Register of Historic Places the same year. Renamed One Park Place, it was extensively renovated, stripped of asbestos and converted to residential condominiums. Renovation was completed in 2007.
