= Sherman Kwek =

Singaporean businessman

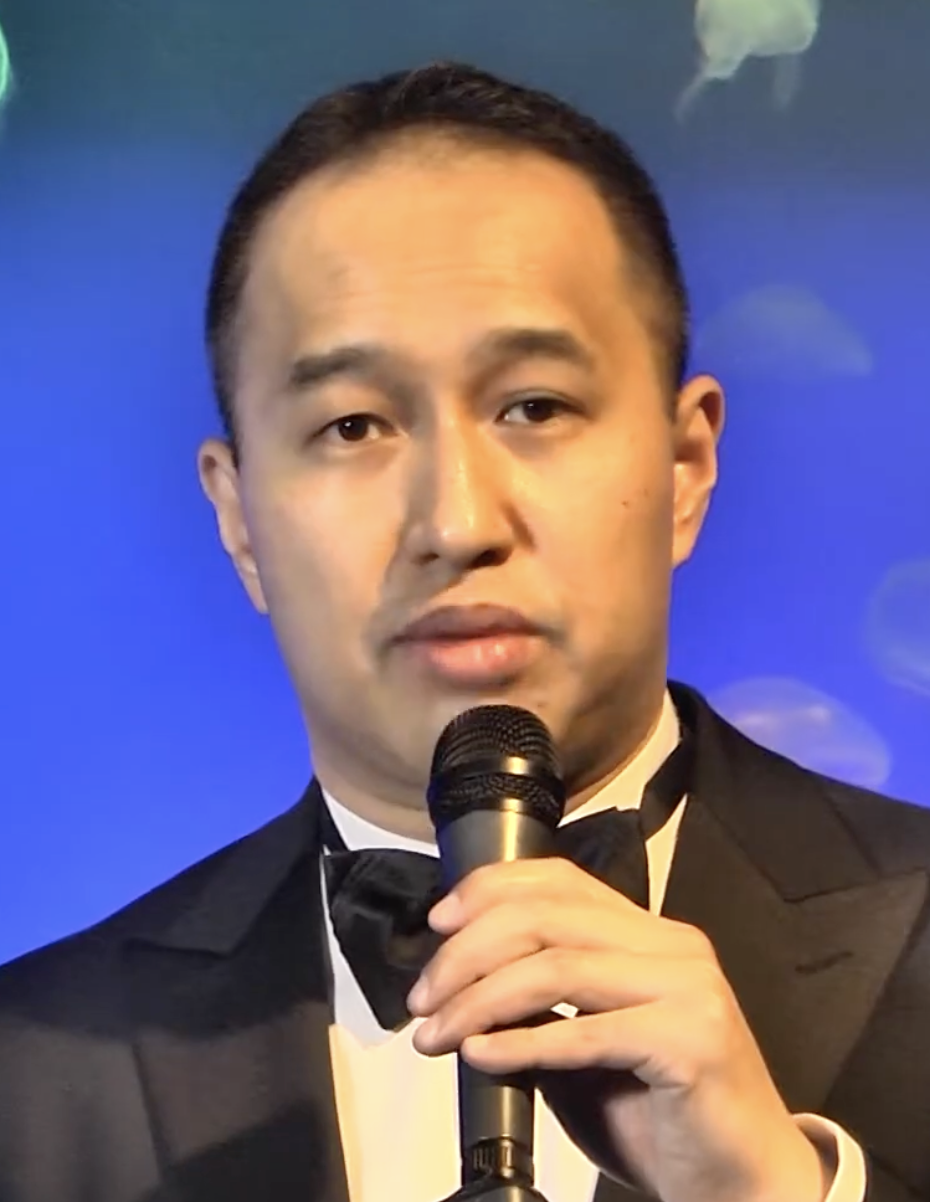
- Kwek in 2016
- Education: Boston University
- Title: Group CEO, City Developments Limited
- Parent: Kwek Leng Beng

Sherman Kwek Eik Tse (Chinese: 郭益智; Pe̍h-ōe-jī: Koeh Ek-tì; born 1976) is a Singaporean businessman, and the group chief executive officer of City Developments Limited since January 2018.

Sherman Kwek earned a bachelor's degree in business administration from Boston University.

In August 2017, Kwek, the deputy CEO, became CEO-designate when then CEO Grant Kelley resigned after three and a half years in the role and left at the end of 2017.

In January 2018, he became the group CEO of City Developments Limited.

In February 2025, Kwek was named in a civil suit filed in the High Court of Singapore commenced by his father Kwek Leng Beng for control of Singapore-based property developer City Development Limited CDL.
