= Kwek Leng Joo =

Singaporean businessman and photographer (1953–2015)

- 郭令裕
- Born: 24 April 1953; Singapore
- Died: 16 November 2015 (aged 62); Singapore
- Occupation(s): Businessman and photographer and environmental activist
- Spouse: Alice Kwek
- Children: 2
- Father: Kwek Hong Png
- Relatives: Kwek Leng Beng (brother)
- Awards: President's Award for the Environment (2015)

Kwek Leng Joo (Chinese: 郭令裕; Pe̍h-ōe-jī: Koeh Lêng-jū; 24 April 1953 – 16 November 2015) was a Singaporean businessman, photographer and environmental activist who served as the managing director of City Developments Limited (CDL) from 1995 to 2014, and the deputy chairman of CDL from 2014 until his death. He also served as the president of the Singapore Chinese Chamber of Commerce and Industry (SCCCI) from 1993 to 1997 and from 2001 to 2005 and a trustee of the Nanyang Technological University.

Kwek Leng Joo had two children, including Kwek Eik Shing.

== Life and career ==
Kwek Leng Joo was born on 24 April 1953. His father, Kwek Hong Png, was the founder of Hong Leong Group, the parent company of CDL. He has an older brother, Kwek Leng Beng. The Kwek family had origins from the Fujian, China. Kwek attended the Anglo-Chinese School and Maris Stella High School; he obtained diplomas in hotel management from New York University and Takushoku University.

In 1976, Kwek became a director of the Hong Leong Group; he became a director of CDL in 1980.

In 1993, Tan Eng Joo, the previous president of the SCCCI, convinced Kwek to run for the president of the SCCCI. Becoming the second-youngest president, he led reforms for the SCCCI by changing the voting system. After the death of his father in 1994, Kwek was active in the business of the Hong Leong Group. He emphasised the importance of unity within the Chinese in his inaugural address.

In the early 1990s, Kwek was one of the first promoters of corporate social responsibility (CSR), where he promoted CSR within CSL. In 1995, he also led the company to adopt the ethos "Conserving as it Constructs"; his efforts to publish sustainability reports was dismissed by its investors.

In 2001, Kwek professionally started his photography career after having to photograph photos for CDL's calendar from cost-cutting measures, after beginning an amateur career since secondary school. He raised more than S$3 million (US$2.24 million) through the sales of photography and art works to charity and environmental causes, including S$550,000 (US$410,447.76) for the President's Challenge 2015. He collaborated with painter Lin Lu Zai and opened the exhibition Soul & Sensibilities in October 2015, consisting of 40 artworks in which Lin applied traditional Chinese brush painting and calligraphy to modern photographs taken by Kwek. It was displayed in the National Museum of Singapore.

On 16 November 2015, Kwek died in his sleep due to a heart attack. A private funeral was held on 20 November, and he was cremated. Before his death, he had donated S$5 million (US$3.73 million) to promote CSR practices to the Nanyang Technological University.
