= Neoparium =

Neoparium, also known as Neopariés, is a glass material made in Japan by Nippon Electric Glass. Described as "crystalized glass ceramic," it was developed as an architectural cladding material for use in harsh environments. Typical units are 5/8" thick in a number of opaque colors. Panels can be fabricated with curves.

The material was most notably used to replace failing marble cladding on the BMA Tower in Kansas City, Missouri, where material replacement was reviewed for compliance with National Register of Historic Places status. Another use was cladding Marco Polo House, an office building built in 1987 in the Victorian district of Battersea, London.
