= Eco-Business =

Singaporean non-profit organization

Eco-Business is an independent business intelligence and advisory company in the Asia Pacific. Founded in 2009, the company is headquartered in Singapore and has a presence in Beijing, Hong Kong, Manila, Kuala Lumpur and Jakarta.

In 2021, it was reported to have more than 3 million page views annually and over 89,000 global subscribers to their weekly newsletter.

The digital-only content platform focuses on business and policy developments around the world through an environmental, social and governance (ESG) perspective.

== History ==
Eco-Business was founded in 2009 by Jessica Cheam, a journalist formerly with The Straits Times. While reporting on energy issues for the Singapore daily newspaper, Cheam observed that issues related to climate change and sustainable development received limited coverage in mainstream media, despite their growing importance.

Eco-Business was established to provide a platform for discussing sustainability issues in the Asia-Pacific region.

It became Asia's first sustainability news desk and has expanded in size, reach and readership, establishing representatives across the region and globally.

Originally launched as a digital news organization through the online site eco-business.com, Eco-Business later expanded its activities to include consulting and advisory services, white paper publishing, sustainability training and capacity building. Within a few years of their initial launch, Eco-Business expanded its services to include the publication of job and event listings, press releases, research and business intelligence.

Over the years, Eco-Business has won regional and international recognition for its work. In 2013, it was awarded the Lee Foundation Excellence in Environmental Reporting by a Media Organisation Merit Award at the Asian Environmental Journalism Awards. The company became carbon neutral in 2017. In 2018, it received a Jackson Wild Media Award for its documentary From Asia to Antarctica. The following year, in 2019, Eco-Business won the Best Site / Mobile Site award at the Asian Digital Media Awards, organised by the World Association of Newspapers and News Publishers (WAN-IFRA).

In 2020, it received recognition from WAN-IFRA in categories such as Best Native Advertising/Branded Content, Best Use of Online Video, and Best Project for News Literacy. Its editorial work has been acknowledged by the Society for Publishers in Asia (SOPA).

== Initiatives ==
In 2016 and 2017, Eco-Business collaborated with City Developments Limited to launch EcoBank, an annual initiative involving a marketplace and silent auction of second-hand items, aimed at encouraging responsible consumption through collaboration between the private and public sectors.

Eco-Business also partnered with OCBC Bank in the development of the OCBC Climate Index, a measure of environmental sustainability awareness and climate action among Singaporeans. The index was designed as a tool to inform policymakers and support efforts toward more sustainable behaviour.

In 2018, it launched an annual flagship thought leadership platform with the United Nations Environment Programme (UNEP) focused on sustainable finance and business, called Unlocking capital for sustainability, convening high-level decision makers across business, finance, civil society and government to discuss and support initiatives that mobilise capital for sustainable development projects.

== Activities ==
Eco-Business collaborates with organisations to provide capital to sustainability projects.

Since 2018, Eco-Business has organised the annual "The Liveability Challenge" (TLC) in partnership with Singapore-based non-profit organisation, Temasek Foundation, Asia's largest platform for companies with sustainable technologies aiming to improve the liveability of urban environments. It provides catalytic funding for projects that address climate change, food resilience and circular urban agriculture, and decarbonisation. The initiative provides grant funding and investments from venture capital firms to start-ups to enable them to scale their solutions. Past winners include RWDC Industries, Turtletree Labs, Equatic (previously known as SeaChange Inc), Fairventures Social Forestry, Susteon, TeOra, CricketOne, GAFT, Krosslinker and Ayrton Energy.

Equatic, an American-based start-up which went on to partner with Singapore's national water agency, PUB, to construct the world's largest ocean-based CO2 removal plant in 2025.

TLC 2020 winner TurtleTree Labs contributed to addressing the global shortage of lactoferrin and supported its broader application within the food and beverage industry.

=== ESG Intelligence ===
Eco-Business' ESG Intelligence unit partners with organisations to conduct ESG Intelligence training on sustainability issues, key concepts and trends, and provides strategies on long-term sustainability stewardship for businesses.

In 2022, ESG Intelligence was selected as an official partner by government agency Enterprise Singapore for the Enterprise Sustainability Programme, which provides critical training for SMEs in the country.

=== EB Impact ===
In 2019, Eco-Business launched a non-profit sister organisation, EB Impact, which is a Singapore-registered charity that delivers youth and education programmes to underserved communities in Singapore and Asia.

It launched the first youth-mentorship programme for Singapore called Sustainability Exchange with Meta in 2020. In 2021, OCBC Bank joined the programme to offer funding to the top youth innovations from the programme. EB Impact also launched the region's first Sustainability Media Academy in 2021 to support media practitioners in the Asia Pacific region to raise the quality of coverage of sustainable development-related news through a series of workshops and masterclasses.

=== Impact Documentaries ===
In 2018, Eco-Business founder, Jessica Cheam, was selected to participate in Climate Force: Antarctica 2018, leading to the production of From Asia to Antarctica a short film about climate change and its impact on Antarctica from an Asian perspective. The film was screened as part of the "Changing Course" exhibition held at the ArtScience Museum at Marina Bay Sands aimed at raising awareness about climate change and the need to shift to more sustainable ways of living.

Its latest documentary Wasted was launched at the United Nations Climate Change Conference (COP28) in 2023. Produced and written by Jessica Cheam and Fraser Morton, the film investigates the issue of waste management across an Asian landscape. The film has since been screened across Dubai, Singapore, Malaysia, Hong Kong and international film festivals.

In 2025, an updated version of the film was released featuring Thailand as a new location and featured the United Nations negotiations on a global plastics treaty — an international legally binding instrument on plastic pollution, including in the marine environment. It was featured as part of the Sustainable Futures Film Festival 2025 held at the ArtScience Museum at Marina Bay Sands, Singapore.
