= Kwek Leng Beng =

Singaporean businessman (born 1941)

- 郭令明
- Born: 27 January 1941 (age 85); Singapore, Straits Settlements
- Education: University of London (LLB)
- Occupation: Businessman
- Title: Executive chairman, Hong Leong Group Singapore; Executive chairman, City Developments Limited; Executive chairman, Millennium & Copthorne Hotels
- Spouse: Cecilia Kok Phooi Lin (m. 1970)
- Children: 2, including Sherman Kwek
- Parents: Kwek Hong Png; Tan Cheng Neo
- Relatives: Quek Leng Chan (cousin)
Kwek Leng Beng
- Traditional Chinese: 郭令明
- Simplified Chinese: 郭令明
Transcriptions
Standard Mandarin
- Hanyu Pinyin: Guō Lìngmíng
Southern Min
- Hokkien POJ: Koeh Lēng-bêng

Kwek Leng Beng (Note: Chinese: See Chinese name and romanisations) (born 27 January 1941) is a Singaporean businessman. He is the executive chairman of City Developments Limited (CDL) and Hong Leong Group Singapore, the latter being a diversified conglomerate founded by his father in 1941. Under his leadership, CDL expanded globally through major hotel acquisitions, including The Gloucester and New York's Millennium Hotel, and held an 80% stake in the Plaza Hotel with Saudi investor Al Waleed bin Talal in 1995. He merged CDL's hotel chains into Millennium & Copthorne Hotels, which became the first Singapore-based company with primary listing on the London Stock Exchange in 1996.

Kwek developed several iconic Singapore properties, including King's Hotel in 1968, Republic Plaza in 1998, and The Sail @ Marina Bay in 2002. He was also involved in the early bidding for Marina Bay Sands through a partnership with Las Vegas Sands, though CDL withdrew in 2006. Forbes has consistently ranked Kwek as one of the richest people in Singapore; in January 2026, the magazine estimated his net worth at $4.8 billion.

== Early life ==
Kwek Leng Beng was born on 27 January 1941 in Singapore, the second child and first son of Kwek Hong Png and his first wife, Tan Cheng Neo. Kwek's father—who had left Tongan, Fujian, China for Singapore as a penniless teenager—founded general trading firm Hong Leong a few months after Kwek's birth. World War II put a temporary halt to the fledgling business and Kwek's mother died from shock after a bombing raid.

Kwek was raised by his grandmother in a shophouse along the Singapore River. After the war, at the age of five, Kwek moved into a bungalow in Buckley Road in Newton that his father had just acquired.

Kwek attended Beatty Primary School and Bartley Secondary School. At age 17, he began running errands at the Hong Leong office for S$150 a month. Kwek subsequently enrolled at the University of London, graduating in 1963 with a Bachelor of Laws. However, he was not keen on becoming a lawyer and returned to Singapore the same year to join the family business as an entry-level management executive. In 1966, Kwek's father decided that Hong Long should establish a financial services arm called Hong Leong Finance, which Kwek became a director of.

== Career ==
=== Early career ===
Kwek's father soon entrusted him with Hong Leong's investments, after determining that he was adept at striking deals. In the late 1960s, amid rising tourism, the Singapore government began encouraging developers to build more hotels in the country. Hong Leong won a tender in 1968 to build its first hotel in Havelock Road (next to the Singapore River), with a land cost of S$980,000. The 12-storey, 175-room King's Hotel — whose name was reportedly chosen by Kwek himself because "I knew I would be the king of hotels" — took about S$4.7 million and two years to complete. A second tower with 142 additional rooms was later added to the development.

In October 1969, Kwek and two other Hong Leong employees joined the board of directors of the struggling real estate developer City Developments Limited (CDL). Kwek was tasked with overseeing the implementation of a rescue package that would resolve CDL's cash flow problems. In 1972, Hong Leong acquired a majority share of the publicly-listed company. Following the 1973 oil crisis, Hong Leong assumed full control of CDL's management and Kwek became managing director a year later.

=== Overseas expansion ===
In 1990, Kwek's father was found guilty of breaching the Companies Act, having improperly authorised a real estate company that Hong Leong largely owned to pay another real estate brokerage. He was fined S$5,000 and made to step down as chairman of both CDL and Hong Leong. Kwek took over both roles, while his younger half-brother Leng Joo became CDL's managing director.

Under Kwek's leadership, CDL made its first European acquisition—The Gloucester in London—in 1993. In 1994, CDL acquired the Millenium Hotel (whose name had been deliberately misspelt by owner Peter Kalikow) in Lower Manhattan, New York City for $75 million. Kwek appointed Hilton Hotels to manage the 561-room property and ordered that its name be changed to "Millennium". A few months later, Kwek purchased the Hotel Macklowe, also in New York City, for $96 million. A year later, he acquired an adjacent building occupied by the Newspaper Guild for $3.4 million and converted it into an extension wing of the Hotel Macklowe, which reopened in 1999 as the Millennium Premier New York Times Square.

Kwek assumed full leadership of Hong Leong after his father's death in November 1994. In April 1995, Kwek and Saudi investor Al Waleed bin Talal Al Saud acquired an 80% stake in the Plaza Hotel (which Donald Trump owned 51% of) from a Citibank-led creditor syndicate. The deal was structured around the assumption and restructuring of the Plaza's substantial debt, which had been incurred following the U.S. real estate market crash in the early 1990s; Kwek and Al Waleed contributed just over $100 million in equity. The transaction valued the Plaza at approximately $325 million, significantly below the $407.5 million paid by Trump in 1988 using largely borrowed funds. To commemorate their purchase, Al Waleed gave Kwek a gold-dipped AK-47 with its firing pin removed.

Following the acquisition, Trump retained a minority interest and a role in marketing and condominium penthouse development at the Plaza. Day-to-day operations were entrusted to Fairmont Hotel Management, in which Al Waleed held a significant stake. Kwek later described Trump's involvement as limited, noting that operational authority rested with the new owners, while Trump's advisory role was given "to pacify him".

In August 1995, Kwek secured a £219 million deal to purchase Copthorne Hotels Holdings, which had 16 hotels across the United Kingdom and Europe, from Aer Lingus. Kwek's string of hotel purchases worldwide attracted public attention, with Louis Kraar of Fortune calling him the "Mystery Man" who "pays Donald Trump's allowance". By this time, Kwek was already overseeing a portfolio of more than 50 hotels in 11 countries, making him one of the largest hotel owners globally. CDL's Millennium and Copthorne chains were subsequently merged into one entity, Millennium & Copthorne Hotels, which was listed on the London Stock Exchange in April 1996—the first Singapore-based group to secure primary listing on the exchange.

In November 1999, Kwek closed a $640 million deal to purchase 47 Regal hotels in the United States, which were to be renamed under the Millennium brand. A week later, he announced that CDL would be acquiring the Seoul Hilton for $213.5 million.

=== Republic Plaza ===
Republic Plaza originated in the mid-1980s as an ambitious commercial development in Singapore's central business district, initially conceptualised by Jones Lang Wootton and promoted by a joint venture led by Japanese trading and construction firms alongside Australian firm Land Equity. However, in 1987, Kwek's father acquired two key land parcels on the planned development site from OCBC Bank at S$51.3 million. Following negotiations with the original joint venture, CDL secured a 50% stake in Republic Plaza in 1988, with the remaining interests held by C. Itoh, Land Equity, and Shimizu Corporation. In 1990, Land Equity exited the project and sold its 20% stake to CDL for S$19.5 million.

Construction commenced in late 1991, with foundation works completed a year later and the superstructure rising through 1993 and 1994. In 1996, CDL bought out the remaining stakes of its Japanese partners for S$47 million. At the opening of the S$650 million skyscraper in January 1998, Kwek, who had taken over the project after his father's death, said: "When the economy was facing a slump in the 1980s, CDL held on to its bold vision of establishing a world-class landmark on the Singapore skyline. Today, our flagship building stands as a testimony to our long-term business strategy and the successful handover of CDL's first-generation leaders to the second generation." At the time of its completion, it was the joint-tallest building in Singapore alongside OUB Centre and UOB Plaza, with a height of 280 metres (920 ft).

=== The Sail ===
In March 2002, Pontiac Land Group triggered the Singapore government's "reserve list"—state land parcels not immediately launched for sale but kept available for developers to apply for—for a plot of land in Marina Bay. At Kwek's direction, CDL entered the race, based on the assumption that weak market conditions would limit competitive bidding. True enough, no other bidders emerged and CDL secured the site with a marginally higher bid of S$288.9 million, just 3 per cent above Pontiac's offer of S$280 million.

The site was designated a "white site", allowing flexible use, and initial plans leaned towards office development, consistent with its location in the Downtown Core. However, amid an oversupply of office space—exacerbated by the upcoming Marina Bay Financial Centre—Kwek abandoned the conventional approach. A potential pre-sale to Standard Chartered fell through, reinforcing his view that a purely commercial project would be uninspired and poorly timed.

Instead, Kwek announced that the project, later named The Sail @ Marina Bay, would be a waterfront residential development that would inject life and imagination into a subdued market. It would also be the first major residential condominium in the Downtown Core, as well as the tallest residential building in the country. Initial launches were met with overwhelming demand, with nearly all units sold rapidly despite sharply rising prices. Kwek later reflected: "The Sail is my most iconic residential project and the one which I'm most proud of."

=== Marina Bay Sands ===
In 2004, the Singapore government announced that it would legalise casinos under a new "integrated resort" policy, with one integrated resort to be built in Marina Bay and another in Sentosa. While public response was mixed, Kwek expressed early support for the move and decided to bid for the Marina Bay project. CDL ultimately partnered with Sheldon Adelson's Las Vegas Sands, taking a 15% stake in a Sands-led consortium which became a leading contender for the project. Kwek was actively involved in shaping the bid, including advocating for increased hotel capacity and supporting the appointment of architect Moshe Safdie. Kwek also personally modified Safdie's initial designs.

However, in early 2006, CDL withdrew from the consortium, officially citing "some requirements associated with the bid." Kwek continued to provide informal advice to Las Vegas Sands on design and development matters, and its bid ultimately succeeded. He later suggested that excessive regulatory disclosure requirements associated with gaming investments had contributed to CDL's withdrawal. At the same time, he noted that "many members of my family didn't like for us to be involved in gaming and gambling."

=== Legal affairs ===
On 25 February 2025, Kwek filed court papers to address an "attempted coup" by his son and CDL CEO Sherman Kwek, who had allegedly acted with several board members and directors to seize control of CDL's board. Kwek claimed that his son's group had hastily made significant changes to CDL's board committees and governance, while bypassing the CDL's nomination committee twice to change the composition of the board.

According to Kwek, this violated corporate governance principles. He added in a statement: "As a father, firing my son was certainly not an easy decision. I accept that business decisions are difficult and young people may make business mistakes in their careers and that is understandable, but circumventing corporate governance laws is a red line." However, Kwek later withdrew the case and stated in an August 2025 press conference: "We have put past issues behind us, emerging stronger and more unified."

== Wealth and philanthropy ==
In 1995, Forbes listed Kwek as the richest man in Singapore, with a net worth of $5 billion. At the time, there were only four Singaporean billionaires. He was overtaken in 2004 by Khoo Teck Puat, but reclaimed the number one spot after Khoo's death the following year. In 2006, Kwek dropped to second place on the list again, after his net worth declined to $3.6 billion and was overtaken by Ng Teng Fong's.

In 2023, Kwek donated S$720,000 towards six academic initiatives at the Singapore Institute of Technology (SIT), including bursaries and scholarships for its hospitality business undergraduates. In 2025, Kwek and CDL jointly donated S$24 million to SIT. To recognise Kwek's charitable giving, the building which houses the academic and administrative offices at SIT's Punggol Digital District campus was named the Kwek Leng Beng University Tower.

== Private life ==
Kwek married Malaysian-born former lawyer Cecilia Kok Phooi Lin—whom he had met while they were both studying law in London—in 1970. Their elder son Sherman (born c. 1976) succeeded Grant Kelley as CDL's CEO in January 2018, while their younger son Kingston (born c. 1981) was a private investor in the equity and debt markets who became a venture capitalist. Kwek has a vast collection of sports cars, including an Aston Martin DB9 Volante and a customised Maybach 57 worth S$1.5 million.

== Awards and honours ==
=== Accolades ===
- Yazhou Zhoukan Business Achiever of the Year (1995)
- The Business Times Businessman of the Year (1997)
- Real Estate Developers' Association of Singapore Lifetime Achievement Award (2014)
- TTG Travel Awards Best Travel Entrepreneur of the Year (2014)

=== Honorary degrees ===
- Johnson & Wales University – Doctor of Business Administration in Hospitality Management (1998)
