= Palais Renaissance =

Shopping centre in Singapore

Coordinates: 1°18′24.1″N 103°49′46.4″E

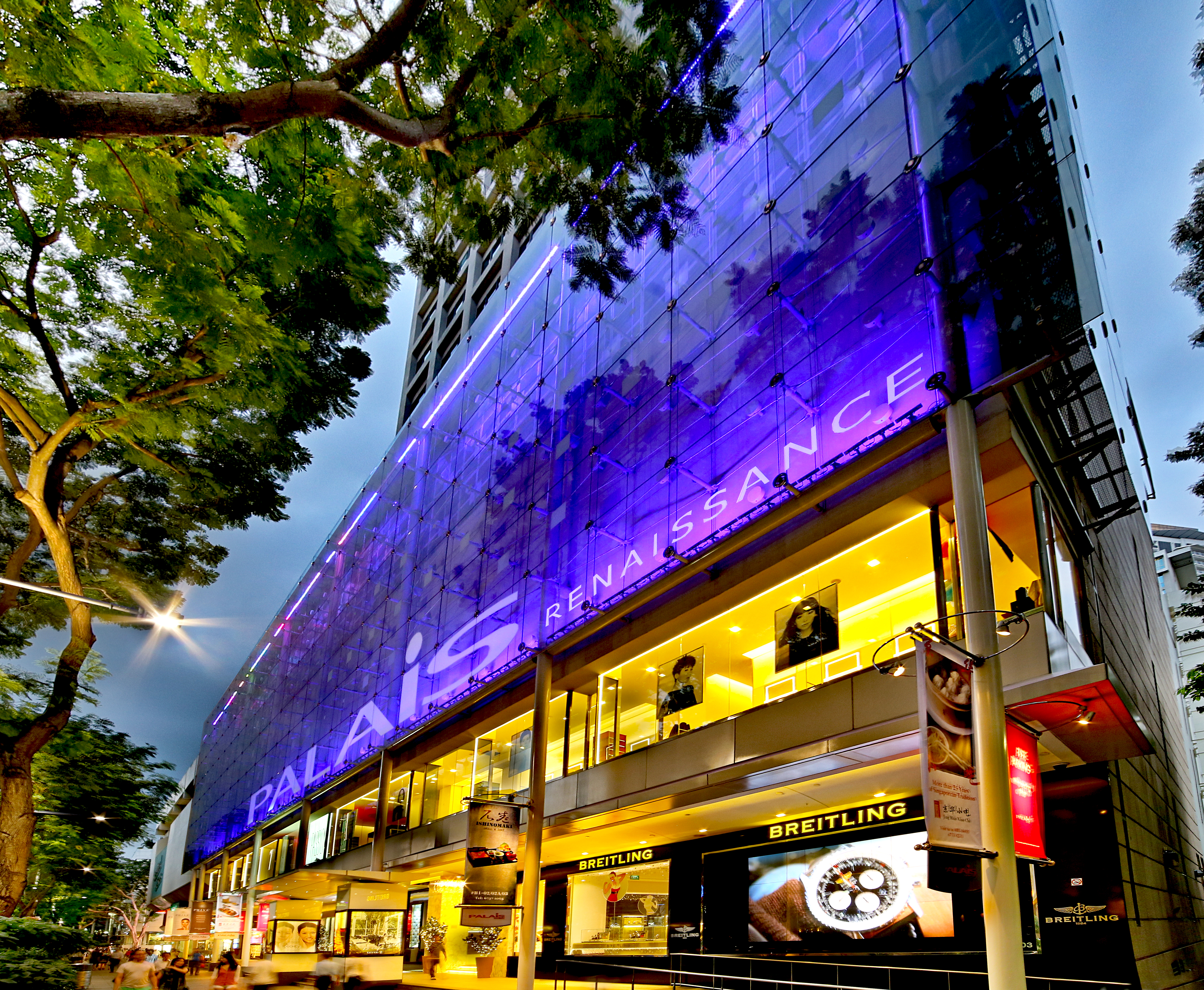
- Location: Orchard Road, Singapore
- Address: 390 Orchard Road, Singapore 238871
- Opened: 1993
- Developer: City Developments Limited
- Owner: Citydev Real Estate

Palais Renaissance, or Palais (pronounced pa-lay) is a mall located in the shopping district of Orchard Road, Singapore. Located between the Royal Thai Embassy and Orchard Towers, Palais Renaissance consists of a 13-storey office block coupled with four storeys of retail space.

Palais Renaissance is owned and managed by property developer City Developments Limited.

== History ==
The mall underwent renovation in 2021 and finished on 10 October 2022. The new mall features restaurants such as Michelin-starred Sushi Kimura, P.S. Cafe, and Merci Marcel.

== Awards ==
2014

Best Service Award – Top 3

Her World Nuyou Mall Awards

2018

Green Mark Platinum Award (Recertified)

Building and Construction Authority (BCA)

== See also ==
- List of shopping malls in Singapore
