= Project Starlight =

Project Starlight may refer to:

- Project Starlight (University of California, Santa Barbara), a research project to develop a fleet of laser beam-propelled interstellar probes
- Project Starlight (military agreement), a 1975 military agreement in which Singaporean soldiers were sent to train in Taiwan
