= Lee family (Singapore) =

Singapore political family

Lee family 李光耀家族 Lee Kuan Yew family
- political family
- Country: Singapore
- Founder: Lee Muk Man (1864, first immigrant); Lee Kuan Yew
- Current head: Lee Hsien Loong
- Titles: List: Prime Minister of Singapore; Deputy Prime Minister of Singapore; Leader of the Opposition; Senior Minister of Singapore; Minister Mentor of Singapore; Minister for Finance; Minister for Trade and Industry; Second Minister for Defence (Services); Member of the Singapore Parliament; Chairman of the Monetary Authority of Singapore; Chairman of the Civil Aviation Authority of Singapore; Director of the National Neuroscience Institute; Director of the Open Government Products; Chairman of Fraser and Neave; Chief Executive Officer of Temasek Holdings; Chief Executive Officer of Singtel; Professor of Economics at Harvard University
- Properties: 38 Oxley Road

The Lee family ([lì]; Chinese: 李; pinyin: Lǐ) is a highly influential Singaporean family of Chinese (Hakka–Peranakan) origin. The family has members prominent in Singaporean politics, public service, law, business and academia.

== Background ==
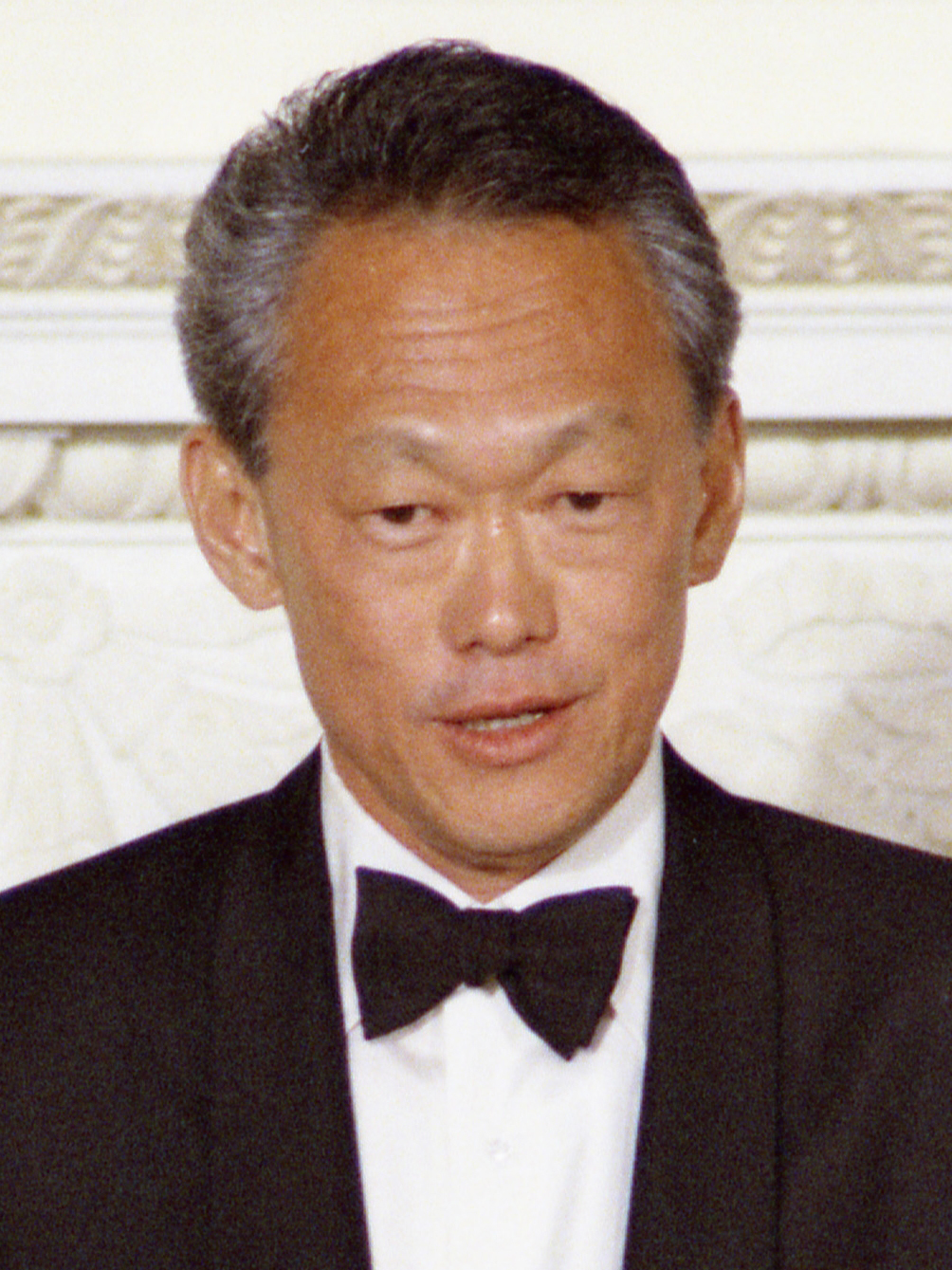
Lee Kuan Yew

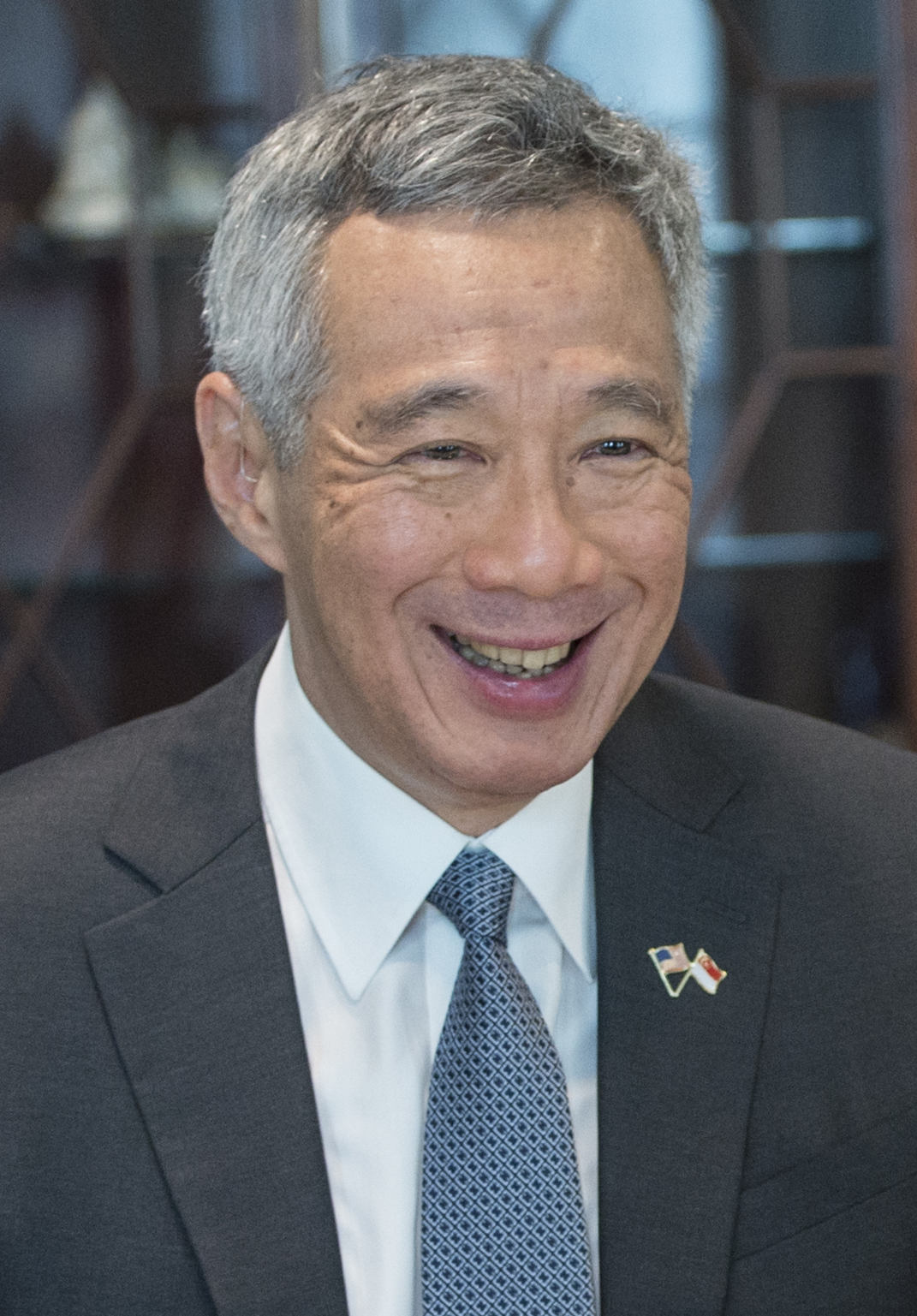
Lee Hsien Loong

The son of Lee Chin Koon and Chua Jim Neo, Lee Kuan Yew served as the first Prime Minister of Singapore and his eldest son Lee Hsien Loong served as the third Prime Minister.

Members of the Lee family also held leadership positions in the People's Action Party which forms the incumbent Government of Singapore.

== Family tree ==
Family tree of Lee Kuan Yew

Lee Bok Boon; 1846–1920	Seow Huan Neo; 1850–c. 1931
Lee Hoon Leong; 1871–1942	Ko Liem Nio; 1883–1959
Lee Chin Koon; 1903–1997	Chua Jim Neo; 1907–1980
Lee Kuan Yew; 1923–2015	Kwa Geok Choo; 1920–2010	Dennis Lee Kim Yew; 1925–2003	Gloria Lee (Woo) Sau Yin; 1926–2023	Freddy Lee Thiam Yew; 1927–2012	Eleanor Ngo Puay Chin	Monica Lee Kim Mon b. 1929	George Chan Chor Cheung	Dr Lee Suan Yew b. 1933	Pamela Chong
Wong Ming Yang; 1951–1982	Lee Hsien Loong b. 1952	Ho Ching b. 1953	Lee Wei Ling; 1955–2024	Lee Hsien Yang b. 1957	Lim Suet Fern b. 1958
Li Xiuqi b. 1981	Li Yipeng b. 1982	Li Hongyi b. 1987	Li Haoyi b. 1989	Li Shengwu b. 1985	Li Huanwu b. 1986	Li Shaowu b. 1995

== Government offices held ==
- Lee Kuan Yew: Member of Parliament 1955–2015; Leader of the Opposition, 1955–1959; Prime Minister of Singapore, 1959–1990; Senior Minister of Singapore, 1990–2004; Minister Mentor of Singapore, 2004–2011
  - Lee Hsien Loong: Member of Parliament 1984–; Acting Minister for Trade and Industry, 1986; Second Minister for Defence (Services), 1987–1990; Minister for Trade and Industry, 1987–1992; Deputy Prime Minister of Singapore, 1990–2004; Chairman of the Monetary Authority of Singapore, 1998–2004; Minister for Finance, 2001–2007; Prime Minister of Singapore, 2004–2024; Senior Minister of Singapore, 2024–
  - Lee Wei Ling: Director of the National Neuroscience Institute, 2004–2014
  - Lee Hsien Yang: Chief Executive Officer of Singtel, 1995–2007; Chairman of the Civil Aviation Authority of Singapore, 2009–2018

Ho Ching: Wife of Lee Hsien Loong; Chief Executive Officer of Temasek Holdings, 2004–2021

== 38 Oxley Road dispute ==
38 Oxley Road is an eight-bedroom two-storey bungalow located near Orchard Road, Singapore. The house was built in the late 19th century and was the residence of the first prime minister of Singapore, Lee Kuan Yew, from the 1940s until his death in 2015. The first meeting of the People's Action Party (PAP) occurred in the basement.

In 2017, it became central to a dispute in Singapore among Lee's children, Lee Hsien Loong, Lee Hsien Yang and Lee Wei Ling, over its use and demolition. Lee Kuan Yew had originally willed the house to Lee Hsien Loong, who later sold it to Lee Hsien Yang in 2015 at market price, on the condition that both of them would donate half of the value to charity.

Lee's will included a condition that his daughter Lee Wei Ling be allowed to stay there. She died on 9 October 2024, opening a range of plausible options for the house as set out by the Ministerial Committee in 2018. The options are to (i) retain the property by gazetting it as a National Monument or for conservation; (ii) retain the dining room and demolish the rest of the property; or (iii) allow the property to be demolished fully and allow for the site to be redeveloped. In 2025, the government gazetted it as a national monument.

== Relation to other prominent families ==
Kwa Geok Choo, the wife of Lee Kuan Yew, is the daughter of Wee Yew Neo, who is in turn the sister of Helene Tan, wife of Tan Chin Tuan. The Tans are another prominent family in Singapore, whose members include:

- Tony Tan, the 7th President of Singapore
- Tan Kim Seng, a Peranakan businessman
- Tan Eng Sian, who the College of Alice and Peter Tan of the National University of Singapore is named after
- Simon Chesterman, former dean of the National University of Singapore Faculty of Law

The Lee family is also distantly related to Teo Chee Hean through Kwa Geok Choo:

- Choo's brother, Kwa Soon Chuan, was married to Ivy Lim Seok Cheng, the second daughter of Lim Chong Pang, who was in turn the son of Lim Nee Soon.
  - Kwa Soon Chuan's daughter was Kwa Kim-Li, who is the managing partner of Lee & Lee.
- Lim Nee Soon's maternal grandfather was Teo Lee, a predecessor of Teo Eng Hock, Teo Soon Kim, and Teo Chee Hean.
  - The Lims were also related to Oei Tiong Ham via Nee Soon's eldest daughter, who married a son of Oei.

The Lee political family is also distantly related to the Lee family that founded the Chinese Commercial Bank, via Kwa Geok Choo:

- Lim Chong Pang, the father-in-law of Choo's brother, Kwa Soon Chuan, was married to the daughter of Lee Choon Guan and Tan Teck Neo.
  - Choon Guan was the son of Lee Cheng Yan.
  - Teck Neo was the daughter of Tan Keong Saik, who Keong Saik Road is named after.
- Lee Choon Guan was the cousin of Lee Keng Kiat, who is the father of Lee Chim Tuan and Lee Chim Huk.
  - Huk was the father of Lee Kip Lin and Lee Kip Lee, the latter being the father of Singaporean creative Dick Lee.
  - Tuan was a maternal cousin of Malaysian politician Tan Cheng Lock.
