= Lee Choo Neo =

Singapore physician (1895–1947)

- 李珠娘
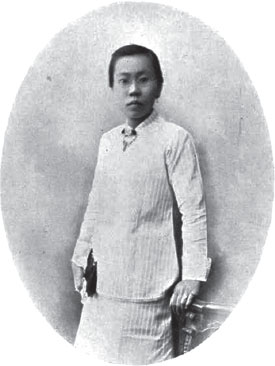
- Lee, c. 1923
- Born: 7 September 1895; Singapore, Straits Settlements
- Died: 7 September 1947 (aged 52); Colony of Singapore
- Education: Singapore Chinese Girls' School; Raffles Girls' School; King Edward VII College of Medicine
- Occupation: Doctor
- Known for: First female doctor in Singapore
- Spouse: Teo Koon Lim (m. 1923)
- Children: Lionel Teo (son); Eileen Teo (daughter); Winnie Teo (daughter)
- Parents: Lee Hoon Leong (father); Mak Hup Sin (mother)
- Relatives: Lee Chin Koon (younger half-brother); Chua Jim Neo (sister-in-law); Lee Kuan Yew (nephew); Lee Hsien Loong (grandnephew); Lee Wei Ling (grandniece); Lee Hsien Yang (grandnephew)

Lee Choo Neo (Chinese: 李珠娘; pinyin: Lǐ Zhūniáng; 7 September 1895 – 7 September 1947) was the first female medical doctor to practice in Singapore. Her father, Lee Hoon Leong, was a merchant of Hakka descent. Her mother was her father's first wife, Mak Hup Sin, who was of Cantonese descent. Lee Choo Neo was also the aunt of Lee Kuan Yew, Singapore's first Prime Minister; his father was her younger half-brother, Lee Chin Koon.

== History ==
Lee attended Singapore Chinese Girls’ School and Raffles Girls’ School. In 1911, Lee Choo Neo became the first Straits Chinese girl to earn the Senior Cambridge Certificate, and in 1918, she graduated from King Edward VII College of Medicine, Singapore. She originally served as an assistant surgeon, overseeing two women's wards at the General Hospital.

Lee Choo Neo married Teo Koon Lim at 114 Emerald Hill on 21 September 1923 and had a son named Lionel Teo Cheng Ann and two daughters namely Eileen Teo Cheng Sim and Winnie Teo Cheng Kim. After several years in the government service, she resigned and followed her husband to Kuala Lumpur who had business there. However, in 1930, she went back to Singapore and opened her own clinic Lee Dispensary on Bras Basah Road, which specialized in maternity care.

In addition to her medical work, she was a founder of the Chinese Ladies' Association of Malaya (later called the Chinese Women's Association), founded in 1915, which raised funds for war, taught domestic skills, introduced outdoor sports, and sponsored a rescue home for at-risk women. She served as the Association's honorary secretary for many years. In 1925 she and two other women were appointed to the Chinese Marriage Committee, which was investigating the need for laws to govern Chinese marriage and divorce in the Straits Settlements. The Chinese Marriage Committee found that women wanted an end to polygamy, while men did not; their findings were a preliminary to the 1961 passage of the Women's Charter, which outlawed polygamy.

Lee Choo Neo died on 7 September 1947, and her grave is located in Singapore in the Bukit Brown Chinese Cemetery.

The Singapore Women's Hall of Fame was created in 2014, and Lee Choo Neo was inducted into it that same year, under the category "Health."
