= Lee Chin Koon =

Singaporean storekeeper and salesman (1903–1995)

- 李進坤
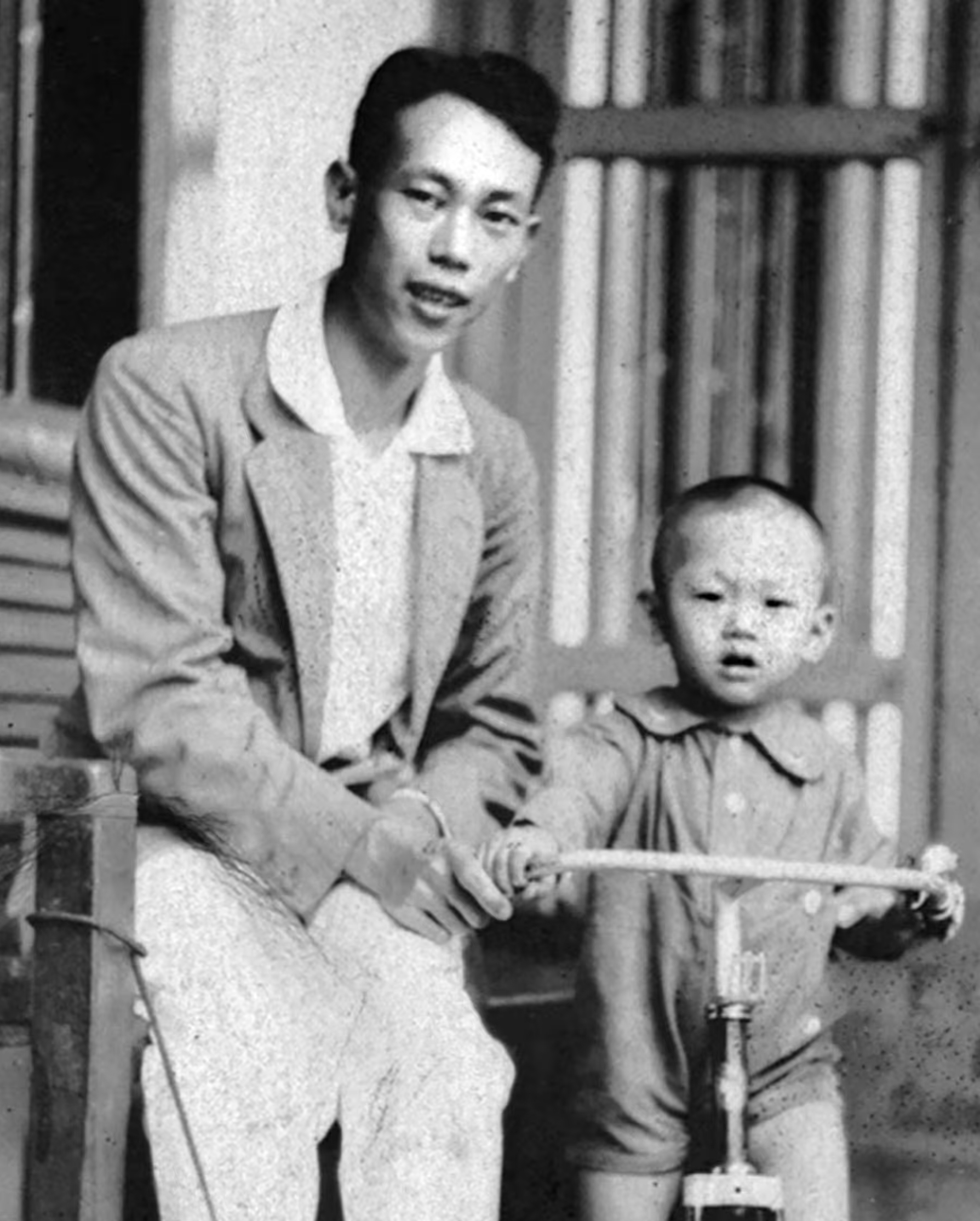
- Lee in 1925 with his son, Lee Kuan Yew
- Born: 1 June 1903; Semarang, Central Java, Dutch East Indies
- Died: 12 October 1997 (aged 94); Singapore
- Spouse: Chua Jim Neo (m. 1921; died 1980)
- Children: 5; including Lee Kuan Yew
- Relatives: Lee family

Chinese name
- Traditional Chinese: 李進坤
- Simplified Chinese: 李进坤
- Hanyu Pinyin: Lǐ Jìnkūn
- Hokkien POJ: Lí Chin-khûn

Lee Chin Koon (Chinese: 李進坤; 1 June 1903 – 12 October 1997) was a Singaporean storekeeper, manager, and salesman who was formerly employed with the Shell Oil Company. Prominently, he was the father of Lee Kuan Yew and the paternal grandfather of Lee Hsien Loong, the first and third Prime Minister of Singapore respectively.

== Early life and career ==
Lee was born on 1 June 1903 in the port city of Semarang, Central Java, during Dutch colonial rule. He was from an upper-class family of Straits Chinese descent and was raised in an English-speaking household. His mother, Indonesian-Peranakan Ko Liem Nio (1883–1959), was local to Semarang while his father, Hakka-Peranakan Lee Hoon Leong (Chinese: 李雲龍; 1871–1942), was born in Singapore. Lee Hoon Leong, worked as a pharmacist and later became a purser at Heap Eng Moh Shipping Line. Lee's paternal grandfather, Li Muwen, was a merchant who had previously done business in Singapore before returning to the Lee family's ancestral home in Tangxi village, Dabu County, where he built the Zhonghandi house.

When Lee was five, his family moved to Singapore, where he studied at St. Joseph's Institution. During the Great Depression, Lee's family was affected but, in the 1930s, he managed to secure a job as a storekeeper for Shell Oil Company, later becoming a manager after World War II. He later worked at the B.P. de Silva jewellery store on High Street, selling watches and jewellery.

In 1957, he helped his son Lee Kuan Yew campaign at the Tanjong Pagar by-election.

== Personal life ==
Lee married Chua Jim Neo (1905–1980) on 20 May 1922 when he was 18 and she was 16 in a traditional Chinese arranged marriage by Chua's family. Together they had 5 children including the first Prime Minister of Singapore, Lee Kuan Yew. In 1945, Lee and Chua bought a bungalow at 38 Oxley Road. Lee was a frequent gambler, usually being stood up by Chua when he went to gamble.

In 1959, after Lee Kuan Yew was elected Prime Minister, Lee led a mostly private life, having told a cousin, "I don't like publicity."

=== Death ===
Lee died on 12 October 1997 at the age of 94. His wife had died in 1980.

Family tree of Lee Kuan Yew

Lee Bok Boon; 1846–1920 | Seow Huan Neo; 1850–c. 1931
Lee Hoon Leong; 1871–1942 | Ko Liem Nio; 1883–1959
Lee Chin Koon; 1903–1997 | Chua Jim Neo; 1907–1980
Lee Kuan Yew; 1923–2015 | Kwa Geok Choo; 1920–2010 | Dennis Lee Kim Yew; 1925–2003 | Gloria Lee (Woo) Sau Yin; 1926–2023 | Freddy Lee Thiam Yew; 1927–2012 | Eleanor Ngo Puay Chin | Monica Lee Kim Mon b. 1929 | George Chan Chor Cheung | Dr Lee Suan Yew b. 1933 | Pamela Chong
Wong Ming Yang; 1951–1982 | Lee Hsien Loong b. 1952 | Ho Ching b. 1953 | Lee Wei Ling; 1955–2024 | Lee Hsien Yang b. 1957 | Lim Suet Fern b. 1958
Li Xiuqi b. 1981 | Li Yipeng b. 1982 | Li Hongyi b. 1987 | Li Haoyi b. 1989 | Li Shengwu b. 1985 | Li Huanwu b. 1986 | Li Shaowu b. 1995
