= Lee Wei Ling =

Singaporean neurologist (1955–2024)

- 李玮玲
- Lee in 1986
- Born: 7 January 1955; Singapore
- Died: 9 October 2024 (aged 69); Singapore
- Education: University of Singapore (MBBS)
- Occupation: Neurologist
- Parent(s): Lee Kuan Yew (father); Kwa Geok Choo (mother)
- Family: Lee Hsien Loong (brother); Lee Hsien Yang (brother)

Lee Wei Ling (7 January 1955 – 9 October 2024) was a Singaporean neurologist. She was the director of the National Neuroscience Institute.

A prominent member of the Lee family, she was the younger sister of Lee Hsien Loong, the older sister of Lee Hsien Yang and the only daughter of Lee Kuan Yew, the founding prime minister of Singapore.

== Early life and career ==
Lee was born on 7 January 1955. She received a President's Scholarship in 1973, before studying in the medical faculty of the University of Singapore (now the National University of Singapore), where she graduated top of her class with a Bachelor of Medicine and Bachelor of Surgery degree before specialising in pediatrics.

She began working in the pediatric ward at the Singapore General Hospital (SGH) and received board certification from the American Board of Clinical Neuropsychology.

== Personal life ==
Lee Wei Ling was the daughter of Lee Kuan Yew and Kwa Geok Choo. She was the younger sister of Lee Hsien Loong and the older sister of Lee Hsien Yang.

Wei Ling enjoyed driving and admitted to speeding on a visit to New Hampshire in 1995; she was pulled over by highway police but was released by the sympathetic officer after discussing the caning of Michael Fay.

In 2015, shortly after the death of her father, Lee Wei Ling published an autobiographical book, A Hakka Woman's Singapore, based on columns that she had previously written. She publicly spoke against hero worship of the founding Prime Minister. In 2016, an editor at The Straits Times accused Lee of plagiarism in an unpublished article. Lee publicly supported freedom of speech and stated that she would cease writing for the newspaper following the editorial dispute.

In 2022, Lee Wei Ling reportedly sold a property worth S$50 million to Yonghong Shi, a cofounder of Haidilao.

=== Administrator of Lee Kuan Yew's will ===
Lee Wei Ling and her brother, Lee Hsien Yang, were the joint administrators and executors of Lee Kuan Yew's will. However, they were in a dispute in 2017 with Lee Hsien Loong over their late father's will with regard to the house at 38 Oxley Road. They "felt threatened by Lee Hsien Loong's misuse of his position and influence over the Singapore government and its agencies to drive his personal agenda". They alleged that Hsien Loong used his father's legacy to improve Hsien Loong's reputation and that he thwarted the will of their father in order to use the house at 38 Oxley Road as a monument to their father, which was something that their father allegedly did not want. They also criticised the influence of Ho Ching over the government, and alleged that the Prime Minister harboured political ambitions for his son, Li Hongyi. A special parliamentary session was held to clear the Prime Minister of any wrongdoings and the siblings agreed to keep the dispute private after the session.

=== Illness and death ===
In August 2020, Lee Wei Ling stated on a Facebook post that she had been diagnosed with progressive supranuclear palsy, a rare brain disorder that results in the weakening of certain muscles. Lee was known for her stoicism and stated that she would "endure" in the face of her condition.

Lee died at her home on 9 October 2024, at the age of 69. Her body was cremated at Mandai Crematorium, and her ashes were scattered in sea off Scotland.

== Publications ==
- Lee, Wei Ling; Yap, Koon Hong (2016). A Hakka woman's Singapore stories: my life as a daughter, doctor, and diehard Singaporean. Singapore: Straits Times Press. ISBN 978-981-4642-47-7.

Family tree of Lee Kuan Yew

Lee Bok Boon; 1846–1920	Seow Huan Neo; 1850–c. 1931
Lee Hoon Leong; 1871–1942	Ko Liem Nio; 1883–1959
Lee Chin Koon; 1903–1997	Chua Jim Neo; 1907–1980
Lee Kuan Yew; 1923–2015	Kwa Geok Choo; 1920–2010	Dennis Lee Kim Yew; 1925–2003	Gloria Lee (Woo) Sau Yin; 1926–2023	Freddy Lee Thiam Yew; 1927–2012	Eleanor Ngo Puay Chin	Monica Lee Kim Mon b. 1929	George Chan Chor Cheung	Dr Lee Suan Yew b. 1933	Pamela Chong
Wong Ming Yang; 1951–1982	Lee Hsien Loong b. 1952	Ho Ching b. 1953	Lee Wei Ling; 1955–2024	Lee Hsien Yang b. 1957	Lim Suet Fern b. 1958
Li Xiuqi b. 1981	Li Yipeng b. 1982	Li Hongyi b. 1987	Li Haoyi b. 1989	Li Shengwu b. 1985	Li Huanwu b. 1986	Li Shaowu b. 1995
