= Morgan Chua =

- 蔡興順
- Chua in 2011

Personal details
- Born: Chua Heng Soon Morgan; 3 May 1949; Singapore
- Died: 22 March 2018 (aged 68)

Morgan Chua Heng Soon (Chinese: 蔡興順) (3 May 1949 – 22 March 2018) was a Singaporean political cartoonist. He was born in the Year of the Bull and the month of Taurus, his signature mascot.

Chua was known for his astute and biting political cartoons. He was described as "Review's Unsparing Brushman" by the South China Morning Post in the 14 March 1976 issue and by Asia Week as the "Legendary Cartoonist of Singapore".

== Early life ==
Chua was born at Byrne's Maternity Clinic in Singapore on 3 May 1949. He is the eldest of seven children (five younger sisters and a younger brother) born to Henry Chua Peng Yam, an Electrical and Sanitary Contractor, and his wife, Lily Teo Wah Sek

Describing his childhood, Chua mentioned he often drew animated strips with rolled paper to entertain his sisters, brother and the children in our neighborhood. Many believed these strips were good enough for entrance to the Nanyang Academy of Fine Arts in Singapore.

Chua was educated in Presbyterian Boys' School and he joined the 5th Singapore Company of Boys' Brigade.

== Career ==
Chua belongs to the first batch of young men to be called up for the national service in the Singapore Armed Forces (SAF) in 1967. His drawings were first published by the National Pioneer, a magazine published by SAF, which provides news on army matters relating to Singapore. The cover of first issue is in plain text and a photo, and Chua's illustrations was published in the second and sequence issues.

He came to realization that he could use cartoon to represent people's voices and worked voluntarily for the National Pioneer. "I will always serve my people and my country", Chua said.

=== The Singapore Herald ===
D-Day of The Singapore Herald (28 May 1971 issue)

Chua began working for the newly established daily The Singapore Herald in 1970 as the chief editorial artist. In 1971, the government closed the paper, alleging foreign financed plots, "Black Operations". The paper was critical of prime minister, Lee Kuan Yew, who was offended by Chua's cartoon of Lee on a tank threatening to crush a baby representing press freedoms that reportedly caused the newspaper's shutdown.

=== Far Eastern Economic Review ===
Chua moved to Hong Kong, to the newly established weekly, The Asian. Derek Davies, the editor of the Far Eastern Economic Review (FEER) had taken notice of Chua from his days in Singapore. So after travelling and working in Europe for 3.5 months, in late 1972 he began to do cartoons for the FEER. This led to him being hired as its first art director on 1 December 1972, at the age of 23. His work in this period included images of leaders such as Prince Sihanouk, Tun Razak, Indira Gandhi and Lee Kuan Yew.

The FEER enjoyed almost two decades of rapid growth. Iconic covers include Chua's image of Li Ka-shing as "Superman Li", and Margaret Thatcher leading the surrender. In 1981, Chua received a letter from Li Ka-shing for FEER's "Superman Li" cover. According to Chua, his inspiration for this cover was partly influenced by his son.

=== Tiananmen Square massacre ===
Morgan took a sabbatical from the FEER in 1988–89 to travel the Silk Road and other parts of China in early 1989. That happened to coincide with the 1989 Tiananmen Square protests and massacre on 4 June 1989, and Chua was so shocked by this event that he draw more than 100 cartoons of the massacre and was later published in his book Tiananmen in the same year.

=== Back to Singapore ===
Returning to FEER, he remained there until changing circumstance at the publication combined with a desire to return closer to his Singaporean roots. He returned to Singapore in 1999 and spent most of the next 20 years between Singapore and Tanjung Pinang, Bintan, Indonesia.

As a semi-retiree enjoying life, he accepted the limitations of cartooning in Singapore and became acceptable to the leaders, including doing a book of cartoons of Lee Kuan Yew which was, he said, to "show the humane side" of the leader". In a short span of 20 years back in Singapore, he had closely worked with publishers, inspired many young cartoonists and illustrators and has published a few books of cartoons, particular to Singaporean.

In 2011, he received a complimentary letters from Lee Kuan Yew and Lee Hsien Loong for his work on Lee's late wife, Kwa Geok Choo — In Memory of Kwa Geok Choo (1921-2010), which according to Chua "is even better than the Cultural Medallion award".

In 2013, Chua illustrated former president S. R. Nathan's 50 Stories From My Life.

=== Illustrations for BBC ===
The illustrations of Zhou Yong-kang by Chua for the British Broadcasting Corporation (BBC) was published on 13 June 2015. Zhou was convicted of bribery, abuse of power and the intentional disclosure of state secrets by the Intermediate Court. Zhou was said to have taken 129 million yuan (over $20 million) in bribes.

== Death ==
Chua was hard at work right up to the time he was down with Pleural effusion. He died on Thursday, 22 March 2018, aged 68, after he was hospitalized in a hospital in Bintan and in a coma from which he never recovered. Chua was accompanied by his son and returned to Singapore on 23 March 2018.

== Selected works ==
- Ying & Yang (1975) — A cartoon series from Far Eastern Economic Review
- Yum Char's Travels: A Voyage to Gnokgonh (1976)
- Hong Kong Book of Records (1979) — A book compiling Hong Kong's unusual history with Morgan's cartoons
- Tiananmen (1989) — A cartoon series depicting the 4 June massacre
- My Singapore (2000)
- My Singapore (2008) — Updated edition with new cartoons
- 50 Years Ago (2009)
- Chronicle of Singapore (2009) — Illustrated pages about the future of Singapore
- Divercity Singapore – A Cartoon History Of Immigration (2010)
- In Memory of Kwa Geok Choo (1921-2010) (2011) — A cartoon series about the late wife of Mr Lee Kuan Yew
- L.K.Y: Political Cartoons (2014) — A compilation of LKY's sketches over the years, showing the human side of LKY
- Tiananmen 25th Anniversary Edition (2014) — New cover with revised content
- Robert Chua: TV50 Golden Years The Hong Kong Story (2018)
