= Li Hongyi =

Li Hongyi may refer to:

- Li Hongyi (actor) (born 1998) a Chinese actor and singer
- Li Hongyi (administrator) (born 1987), a Singaporean public service administrator
- Li Renda (died 947), a Chinese general who was given the name Li Hongyi by Southern Tang's emperor Li Jing
