= Lee & Lee =

Law firm in Singapore

Lee & Lee is a Singaporean law firm founded by Singapore's first Prime Minister Lee Kuan Yew, his wife Kwa Geok Choo, and his brother Dennis Lee Kim Yew.

== History ==
After passing the bar, Lee Kuan Yew worked at the Singaporean law firm Laycock and Ong. His frequent representation of activists and trade unions, pro bono, led to disagreements with the firm's management. In 1955, he formed Lee & Lee with his brother and wife. At the beginning, Lee did a variety of low-value cases to support the firm. After he became Prime Minister, he recruited from the firm's ranks, including E. W. Barker, Chua Sian Chin, and S. Ramaswamy, some of who would become ministers in his cabinet. As Lee entered into his premiership, his founding partners took over the leadership of the firm. By the 1980s, it was rated among the four leading local law firms, alongside Drew & Napier, Allen & Gledhill, and Shook Lin & Bok. Lee & Lee was one of the earliest firms in Singapore to work with an international law firm, Norton Rose, for cross-border transactions. It later formed one of the first Singaporean joint law ventures with Lovells, a partnership which later dissolved.

== Notable lawyers ==
- Lee Kuan Yew - First Prime Minister of Singapore
- Kwa Geok Choo - Wife of Lee Kuan Yew
- Dennis Lee Kim Yew - Lee Kuan Yew's brother
- E. W. Barker - Former Minister of Law
- Chua Sian Chin - Former Minister of Health
- S. Ramaswamy - Former Member of Parliament
- Andrew Ang - Former Supreme Court Justice
- Christopher de Souza - Deputy Speaker and Member of Parliament
