= B. P. de Silva =

Singapore jewellery company, founded 1872

B. P. de Silva is a fine and high jewellery company founded by Balage Porolis de Silva in 1872 (154 years ago). The brand is headquartered in Singapore. Beyond jewellery, the brand launches a selection of fine keepsakes and lifestyle goods.

== Background ==
B. P. de Silva was founded in 1872 by Balage Porolis de Silva. He emigrated from Ceylon (now Sri Lanka) to Singapore in the 19th century and began selling gemstones door-to-door before establishing the brand’s first atelier on Singapore's High Street. The company’s flagship boutique is currently located at 14C Dempsey Road, Singapore.

The brand is known as a premier jeweller, commissioning pieces for politicians, royal families, and celebrities. B. P. de Silva received its first royal commission from the Duke of Connaught and later from the Royal Family of Siam (now Thailand) in 1928. Its jewelry has adorned celebrities, including Grammy award-winning artist Laufey. In 1951, upon request from Brunei, Wimalatissa Indrasoma, on behalf of B. P. de Silva, undertook the task of creating two crowns and a scabbard for Brunei's Coronation ceremony held on May 31st, 1951.

== Management ==
Following the resignation of M. W. Indrasoma in November 1964, Dr. M S Amarasuriya, the grandson of B. P. de Silva undertook the role of Managing Director.

The company is currently led by Sunil Amarasuriya as chairman and Shanya Amarasuriya as creative director, representing the fourth and fifth generations of the family.

== Recognition ==
In 2022, to commemorate its 150th anniversary, B. P. de Silva launched its first high jewellery collection. The same year, the company earned B Corp certification, showcasing its commitment to sustainable and ethical business practices.

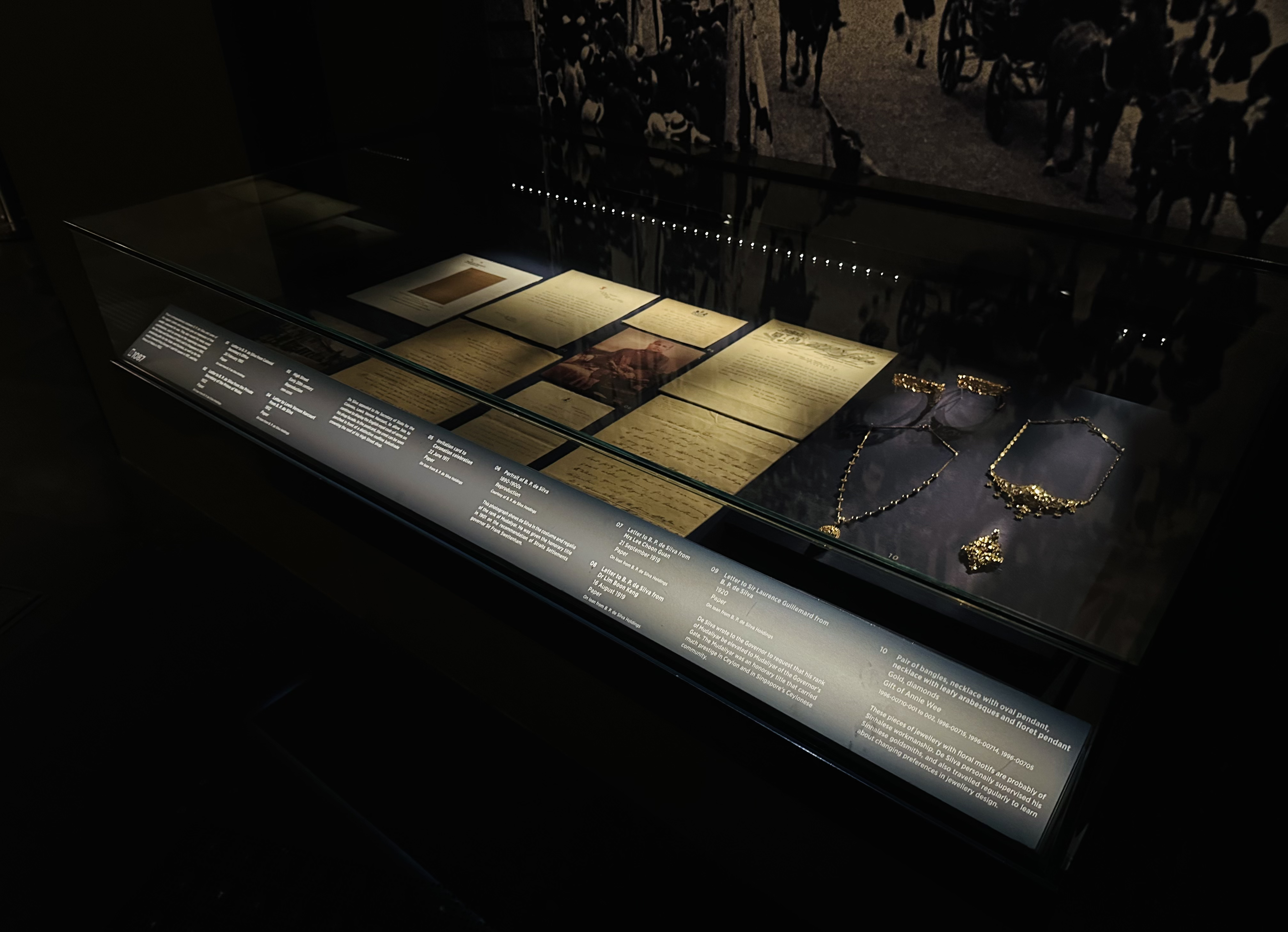
Section at National Museum of Singapore dedicated to B. P. de Silva

B. P. de Silva's contributions to Singapore's cultural and economic history are celebrated in the National Museum of Singapore’s History Gallery. In August 2025, to commemorate Singapore's upcoming 60th anniversary of independence (SG60), B.P. de Silva created The Guardianship Sapphire and Diamond Convertible Necklace. Crafted as a tribute to the nation's history, the one-of-a-kind transformable high jewelry piece features a rare central sapphire from the family's private collection. The necklace was commissioned for the National Museum of Singapore's fundraising charity dinner, where it was auctioned by Christie's to raise funds for renewing the museum's galleries.

B. P. de Silva provides custom and bespoke jewelry services, allowing clients to participate in the design process to create personalized pieces. Whilst specialized in Sapphires, the jeweller also produces ready to wear fine and high jewelry collections featuring gemstones such as diamonds, emeralds, rubies, tourmalines, and more. Its offerings include engagement rings, bridal jewelry, and designs influenced by Art Deco aesthetics.

== Retail Expansion ==
In September 2026, under fifth-generation creative director Shanya Amarasuriya, B.P. de Silva expanded its retail footprint by opening a second boutique at Raffles City Shopping Centre. The location marked a return to the shopping complex, where the brand had originally been featured as one of its foundational tenants during the 1990s. The brand's primary flagship remains located in the Dempsey enclave at 14C Dempsey Road.
