= Li Hongyi (administrator) =

Singaporean government technologist

- Born: 1987 (age 38–39)
- Education: Massachusetts Institute of Technology
- Employer: GovTech
- Parents: Lee Hsien Loong; Ho Ching

Li Hongyi is a Singaporean administrator and software engineer who is currently the director of the Open Government Products (OGP) division of the Government Technology Agency of Singapore (GovTech).

== Early life and education ==
Born in 1987, Li Hongyi is the older son of Lee Hsien Loong, the former Prime Minister of Singapore, and Ho Ching, the former chief executive officer (CEO) of Temasek Holdings. He has a younger brother, Haoyi, and two older half-siblings from his father's first marriage. He studied at Anglo-Chinese School (Independent) and Raffles Junior College.

In 2006, Li won the Lee Kuan Yew Award for mathematics and science and was awarded a Public Service Commission (PSC) Overseas Merit Scholarship to study economics at the Massachusetts Institute of Technology (MIT). He switched his course of study partway and ultimately majored in computer science.

== Career ==
=== National service ===
In 2007, when serving his national service as a Second lieutenant, Li sent an email to then Minister of Defence, Teo Chee Hean, the Chief of Defence Force, the Chief of Army, and hundreds of military personnel alleging that one of his colleagues had been absent without leave (AWOL) on two occasions.

In his email, which exceeded 2,000 words in length, Li criticised the "quality control of officers" in the Singapore Armed Forces (SAF) and asserted that the absent colleague's continued service in the organisation was "an embarrassment". He further wrote that "the SAF is not a charity organisation and does not owe anyone a career".

The Ministry of Defence found that Li had violated the chain of command by sending that email, and formally charged and reprimanded him after a summary trial.

=== Private sector ===
Hongyi worked at Google from 2011 to 2013 as a product manager before returning to Singapore and joining GovTech to serve his six-year bond.

In 2021, he founded a rating site for Singapore's ice cream parlours.

=== Public service ===
Li has held various roles within GovTech, including deputy director of the Government Digital Services Data Science Division, deputy director for data science and AI, deputy director of product and engineering, and director of OGP.

In 2017, a team within GovTech led by Li released Parking.sg, a mobile application which allows drivers in Singapore to pay parking fees digitally instead of using paper parking coupons at all public car parks managed by the Urban Redevelopment Authority (URA) or the Housing and Development Board (HDB) that do not have vehicle gantries.

In 2019, Li founded OGP, a new division within GovTech, with the goal of rapidly building and deploying software products across the Singapore Government. Some of the products produced by OGP include:

- ISOMER, a tool which allows users to easily create secure, mobile-friendly, static websites.
- FormSG, a tool for creating digital government forms.
- JARVIS, a platform for the Singapore Police Force allowing users to rapidly conduct searches and aggregate information.
- ScamShield, a mobile application which identifies and blocks scam SMSes and calls.

== Personal life ==
Li is a member of the Lee family, which has produced two prime ministers of Singapore. Although his parents have denied allegations of grooming him for public office, Li has stated that he has "no interest in politics." Unlike his father and grandfather, Li uses the Hanyu Pinyin romanisation of the family surname (李), spelling it "Li" instead of "Lee."

This stylistic variation aligned with Singapore's national promotion of standardised Mandarin and Hanyu Pinyin during his birth in the 1980s. The distinct spelling was also a deliberate choice by his parents to grant the children a degree of anonymity and encourage independence away from their grandfather's political prominence.
