= Chua Jim Neo =

Singaporean writer

- 蔡認娘
- Born: 16 February 1905; Singapore, Straits Settlements
- Died: 8 August 1980 (aged 75); Singapore
- Occupations: Chef; cookbook writer
- Spouse: Lee Chin Koon (m. 1921–1980)
- Children: 5 (including Lee Kuan Yew)
- Parents: Chua Kim Teng (1865-1943) (father); Leong Ah Soon (1881-1935) (mother)
- Relatives: Chua Ying Chiang (grandfather)

Chinese name
- Traditional Chinese: 蔡認娘
- Simplified Chinese: 蔡认娘
- Hanyu Pinyin: Cài Rènniáng
- Hokkien POJ: Chhòa Jīn-niû

Chua Jim Neo (Chinese: 蔡認娘; Pe̍h-ōe-jī: Chhòa Jīn-niû; 16 February 1905 – 8 August 1980) was a Singaporean chef and cookbook writer best known for Mrs. Lee's Cookbook, which preserves the recipes of Peranakan cuisine. Chua was also the mother of Lee Kuan Yew, the first Prime Minister of Singapore and the paternal grandmother of Lee Hsien Loong, the third Prime Minister of Singapore.

== Biography ==
Chua was born in Singapore in 1905 to Chua Kim Teng, a wealthy local businessman, and Liong A Soen (aka Neo Ah Soon), a Chinese Indonesian of Hakka descent who hailed from Pontianak, West Kalimantan, Dutch East Indies (present-day Indonesia). While her father was born in Singapore, her paternal grandfather came from a Hokkien Peranakan family in Malacca, Malaysia with ancestry from Haicheng, Zhangzhou, Fujian. Her parents then arranged a marriage for her to a storekeeper named Lee Chin Koon and they married when she was sixteen, whilst he was eighteen years old in 1921. Chua and Lee had five children, four sons and a daughter, her first-born was Lee Kuan Yew who went on to become the first Prime Minister of Singapore. Chua saved her family jewelry and money, managing household finances and helping Kuan Yew attend law school in Britain.

In 1974, she wrote Mrs. Lee's Cookbook: Nonya Recipes and Other Favorite Recipes in order to preserve the heritage of Peranakan cuisine (also known as nyonya or nyonya/baba cuisine), which combines Straits Chinese cooking with Malay-style cooking. Chua, a nyonya (Peranakan Chinese woman), was considered a "highly respected authority" on the subject. The original publication included a preface by her cousin Wee Kim Wee, who was then serving as the high commissioner to Malaysia and would later become President of Singapore. The cookbook was updated and republished in 2003 by her granddaughter, Lee Shermay.

Chua died on 8 August 1980, aged 75 and was cremated at the Mount Vernon Columbarium. She was inducted posthumously in to the Singapore Women's Hall of Fame in 2015.
