= Balestier Art Deco shophouses =

Art Deco shophouses in Balestier, Singapore

- Balestier Art Deco shophouses in 2026

General information
- Status: Conserved
- Type: Shophouses
- Architectural style: Art Deco
- Location: 230 & 246 Balestier Road, Balestier, Singapore
- Coordinates: 1.3218°N 103.8526°E
- Completed: 1950s

Design and construction
- Known for: Art Deco style

The Balestier Art Deco shophouses are two shophouses located on 230 and 246 Balestier Road in Balestier, Singapore.

== History ==
The Balestier Art Deco shophouses were built in the 1950s on former cultivating vegetable farmland and ponds, which cultivated taro, in the Art Deco style. Unlike typical shophouses, the art deco shophouses were designed to include individual apartments on each floor of the building. The shophouses are located on either corners of an unnamed side road which runs off of Balestier Road, and are opposite the Goh Chor Tua Pek Kong Temple. The shophouse on 230 Balestier Road houses the Balestier Bak Kut Teh stall, while the shophouse in 246 Balestier Road houses the Hoover Hotel, named after the defunct Hoover Theatre.

The shophouses were conserved in 2003, along with the nearby Balestier Pre-war Shophouses. The shophouses have also been included in the Balestier Heritage Trail by the National Heritage Board.
