= Yang Yongsong =

Chinese military officer (1919–2022)

- 杨永松
- Born: July 1919; Baihou, Dabu County, Guangdong, China
- Died: 1 September 2022 (aged 103); Beijing, China
- Military career
- Allegiance: People's Republic of China
- Branch: Chinese Red Army; Eighth Route Army; People's Liberation Army Ground Force
- Service years: 1931–1978
- Rank: Major General
- Commands: Beijing Military Region
- Conflicts: Chinese Civil War; Fifth encirclement campaign against the Jiangxi Soviet; Long March; Liaoshen campaign; Pingjin campaign; Second Sino-Japanese War; Battle of Pingxingguan; Battle of Xinkou
- Awards: August 1 Medal (3rd Class); Order of Independence and Freedom (2nd Class); Order of Liberation (2nd Class)

Yang Yongsong (simplified Chinese: 杨永松; traditional Chinese: 楊永松; pinyin: Yáng Yǒngsōng; July 1919 – 1 September 2022) was a Chinese military officer, who was a founding major general in the People's Liberation Army. Born in Baihou in Dabu County, Guangdong, he joined the Communist Youth League of China and served in the Red Army from 1931. Yang fought in the fifth counter-encirclement campaign during the Chinese Civil War and was a participant in the Long March. He was present at the 1937 Battle of Pingxingguan and Battle of Xinkou during the Second Sino-Japanese War and was a representative at the 1945 7th National Congress of the Chinese Communist Party. After the war, he was promoted to major-general as one of the "founding generals" in 1955. He was the last surviving general appointed in that year.

== Early life ==
Yang was born in the town of Baihou in Dabu County, Guangdong, in July 1919. His father, a seller of salted fish and pickles, died when he was five years old.

== Civil war and Sino-Japanese War ==
Yang joined the Communist Youth League of China in 1930 and joined the Red Army in 1931. He suffered from a fever during the fifth counter-encirclement campaign but recovered to join the Long March. He joined the Chinese Communist Party (CCP) in 1936. He mainly served in the 101st Regiment, in which he began as a secretary in the 12th Red Army. He was also a dispatcher in both the 3rd Regiment and the 3rd Division of the 1st Red Army, and technical secretary in the political department of the 2nd Division.

During the Second Sino-Japanese War Yang served in a variety of political roles with the 9th Route Army, 343rd Brigade, 2nd Brigade, 5th Regiment and 685th Regiment. He was also secretary general of the political department of the 115th Division. He was present at the 1937 Battle of Pingxingguan and Battle of Xinkou. He then fought in the continuation of the Chinese Civil War, serving as deputy secretary-general of the Political Department of the Northeast Democratic Alliance Army and the political commissar of the Fourth Field Army Armoured Division. He participated in the Liaoshen campaign and Pingjin campaign.

Yang was a representative of the 7th National Congress of the Chinese Communist Party in 1945.

== Post-war life ==
After the establishment of the Communist State, he became director of the Political Department of Armored Corps of North China Military Region in January 1953. He was awarded the military rank of major general (shaojiang) by the Central Military Commission on 27 September 1955. Yang was awarded the third class August 1 Medal, second class Order of Liberation and the second class Order of Independence and Freedom. After graduating from the People's Liberation Army Political College in 1957, he was made deputy political commissar of the Engineering Corps of the Beijing Military Region, and was promoted to political commissar in 1968. He retired in 1978. In retirement, he served as a consultant to the Engineering Corps. He was awarded the Honor Merit Medal of Red Star in 1989.

Yang died from an illness in Beijing, on 1 September 2022, at age 103. He was the last surviving general appointed in 1955 and one of the last four so-called "founding generals" to survive from the 1955–1965 period.
