= Zhonghandi =

House in the Guangdong Province of China

Zhonghandi (Chinese: 中翰第; pinyin: Zhong1han4di4) is a house located at Dangxi Village, Gaopi Town, Dapu County, Meizhou City in Guangdong, China. It is the ancestral residence of Lee Kuan Yew, the founding Prime Minister of Singapore, although Lee himself has never visited the site during his life.

It was designated as a protected cultural site at the county level on April 19, 2005 and was later included in the second batch of city-level protected cultural heritage sites in Meizhou on January 13, 2014.

== History ==
Lee Kuan Yew's great-grandfather, Lee Muk Man, emigrated during the time of the Qing dynasty to Singapore in 1864, then part of the British Straits Settlements, to seek a livelihood. He became a prominent businessman and returned to his hometown in 1884 (approximately the 10th year of the Guangxu Emperor's reign) to construct Zhonghandi.

Starting in 1987, Li Jinkun, third-generation descendant and father of Lee Kwan Yew, started to finance the restoration and conservation of the house. Between 2007 and 2008, the house and its surrounding area underwent refurbishment carried out by the local authorities. In January 2014, the Dapu County government invested 40 million Renminbi to develop the Lee Kuan Yew Ancestral Residence Tourist Scenic Area. The house was listed as a cultural heritage site of Meizhou.

Singapore Prime Minister from 1959 to 1990, Lee Kwan Yew, was a descendant of Lee Muk Man, and his death in 2015 was in part commemorated in his ancestral home, Zhonghandi, though it is commonly admitted that he never set a foot in the house. In 2019, former Minister for Foreign Affairs of Singapore George Yeo, accompanied by his family, visited Zhonghandi and the Lee Kuan Yew Memorial Hall in Dangxi Village, Gaopo Town, during an ancestral worship ceremony in Wenli Village, Anbu Town.

== Description ==
Zhonghandi is oriented from northwest to southeast and constructed with brick and wood. It covers a total area of 223 square meters. Zhonghandi, which belongs to the 'Descending Tiger' (Hokkien: hia⁶ suan¹ houn²) style of Hakka architecture, has eight rooms.

The memorial hall contains four exhibition rooms that narrate Lee's life and the history of Singapore through images and text. A bronze statue depicting Deng Xiaoping and Lee Kuan Yew shaking hands recreates the moment of Deng's first visit to Singapore in 1978. A small figurine of Lee Kwan Yew and his wife Kwa Geok Choo is exhibited in the residence.

The Lee Kuan Yew Ancestral Residence Tourist Scenic Area includes a tourist shopping and leisure street, a wetland park, an entrance landscape zone, a resort villa district, an eco-farm leisure zone, a countryside sightseeing area, a scenic lake viewing area, an Hakka ancient village exhibition area, a fruit orchard picking zone, and a hilltop viewing platform. The project was listed as a "Key Construction Project of 2014" by Dapu County with the aim of developing it into an "International Rural Tourism Destination." As of March 2016, the site received approximately 20,000 visitors per month.

== See also ==
- 38 Oxley Road
- 49 Moonstone Lane
