= Lam Yeo Coffee Powder Factory =

Coffee roaster and shop in Singapore

Coordinates: 1.3238°N 103.8497°E

Lam Yeo Coffee Powder Factory, also known as simply Lam Yeo Coffee Powder, is a shop selling roasted coffee beans and coffee powder blends along Balestier Road in Balestier, Singapore.

== History ==
Originally beginning as a door-to-door business in 1959, the Lam Yeo Coffee Powder Factory was constructed in 1960 on 328 Balestier Road, selling roasted coffee beans coffee powder blends. The name of the shop comes from the Hokkien translation of "Nanyang", as the original owner, Tan Thian Kang, who set up the store with his wife Lim Chok Tee, formerly worked as a deputy editor at the Nanyang Siang Pao. Tan passed ownership to his son, Tan Bong Heong, who later passed ownership to his son, Benny Tan. The coffee blend "Manheling", which is from Sumatra, is one of the most popular blends sold at the shop. The shop remains profitable, having reported a yearly growth by 10% in 2013.

In 2020, the shop is included in National Heritage Board's Street Corner Heritage Galleries programme.

The shop has been included in the Balestier Heritage Trail.
