= House at 9 Buckley Road =

Colonial-era bungalow in Singapore

Coordinates: 1°19′04″N 103°50′24″E

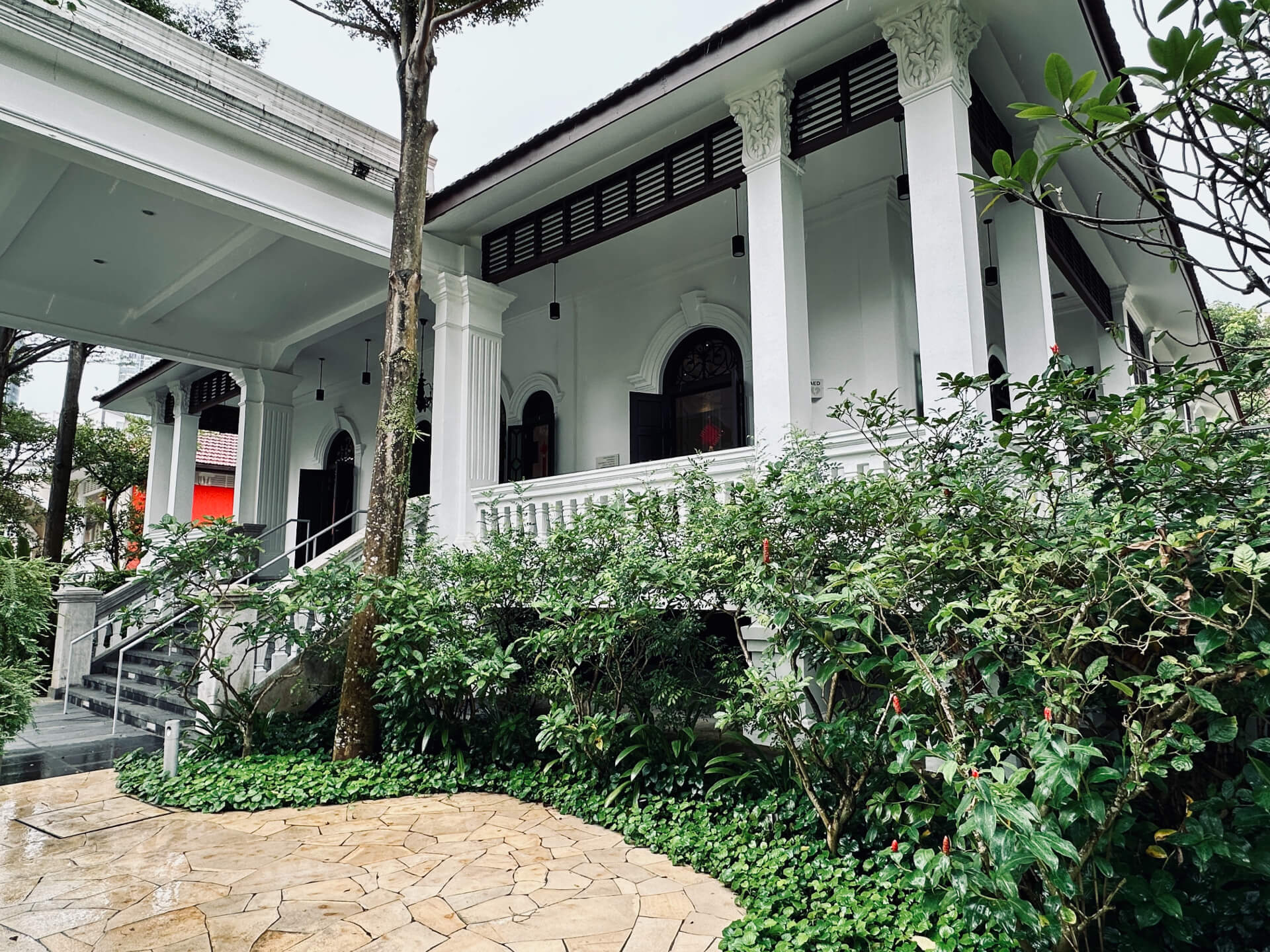
- Interactive map of House at 9 Buckley Road

General information
- Type: Bungalow
- Architectural style: Baroque and Classical revival
- Location: 9 Buckley Road, Novena, Singapore
- Completed: 1932

Design and construction
- Architect: H. A. Stallings
- Developer: City Developments Limited

The House at 9 Buckley Road is a conserved colonial-era bungalow in Novena, Singapore. Designed by architect H. A. Stallings and completed in 1932, it was notably the family home of Kwek Hong Png, founder of the Hong Leong Group, from 1943. The building was granted conservation status by the Urban Redevelopment Authority (URA) in 2008 and has since been restored and integrated as the clubhouse for the Buckley Classique condominium. The bungalow is noted for its mix of architectural styles and a decorative Chinese-style entrance archway, known as the Buckley Arch, which was added in the 1940s.

== History ==
The house was designed by architect H. A. Stallings and built in 1932. According to a 2018 report in The Sunday Times, it was once the family home of Sherman Lim, a grandson of Singaporean tycoon Lim Nee Soon.

In August 1943, Kwek Hong Png, founder of the Hong Leong Group, purchased the 10-year-old residence. He and his family subsequently occupied the house. A highly decorative Chinese entrance archway, later referred to as the Buckley Arch, is believed to have been constructed after the Kwek family moved in.

In the 2000s, the freehold property was developed by City Developments Limited (CDL) into a 64-unit condominium named Buckley Classique. The bungalow was offered for conservation by CDL, an act described by The Sunday Times as a "rare example". The URA granted the building conservation status in 2008. It was then restored and converted into the development's clubhouse. The condominium project was launched in 2011. In a 2018 interview, a resident described the house as evoking "an old Singaporean feel".

== Architecture ==
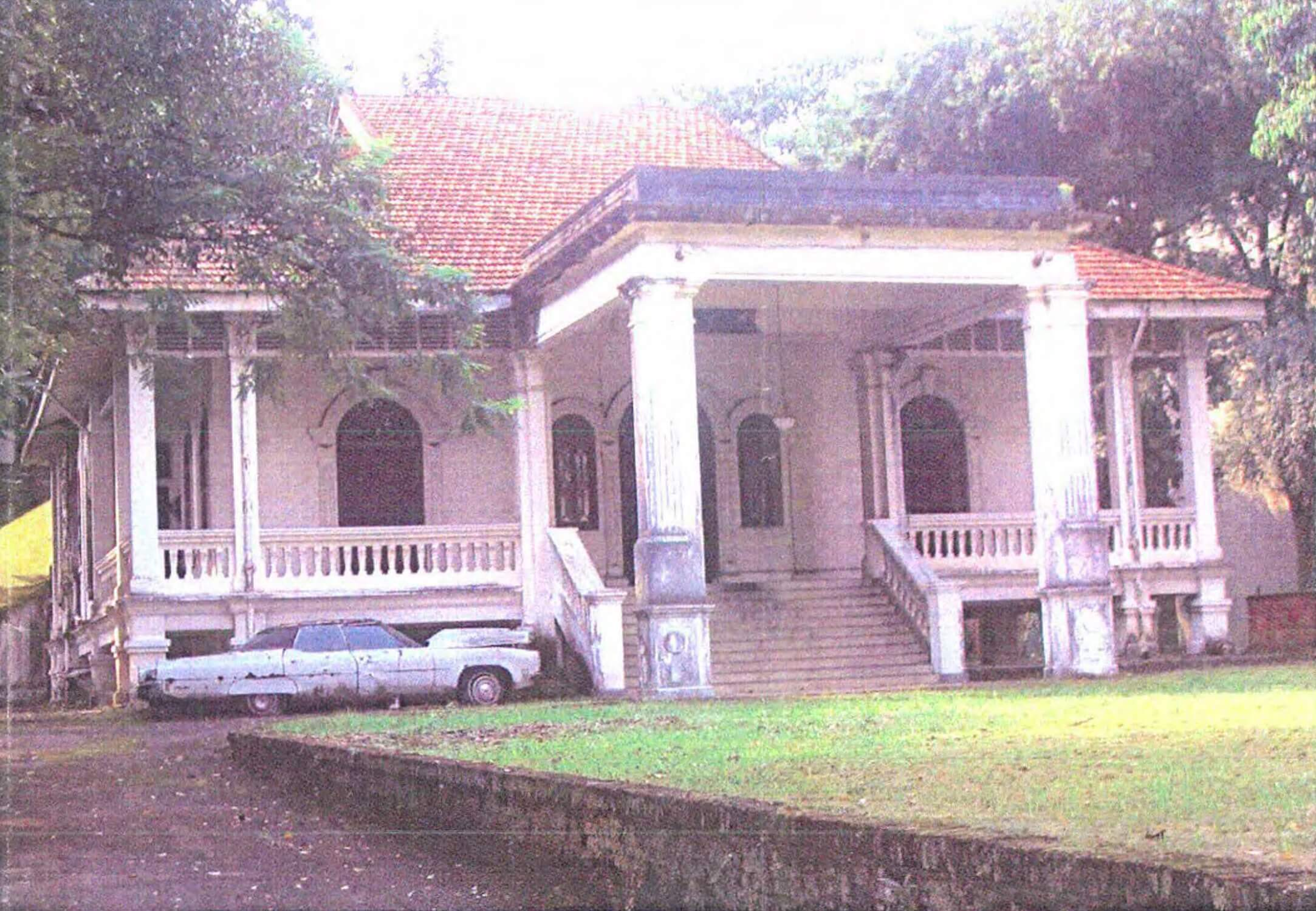
The house before conservation and renovation, showing its raised footing on piers and neo-classical porte-cochère.

The building is described as one of Singapore's remaining houses built on raised footings. Its design is a mixture of Baroque and Classical styles, which were popular prior to the 1930s. The symmetrical bungalow features a large porch, or porte-cochère, and a veranda that circles the structure. In 2018, The Sunday Times noted its similarity to the former home of Lee Kuan Yew at 38 Oxley Road.

=== Buckley Arch ===
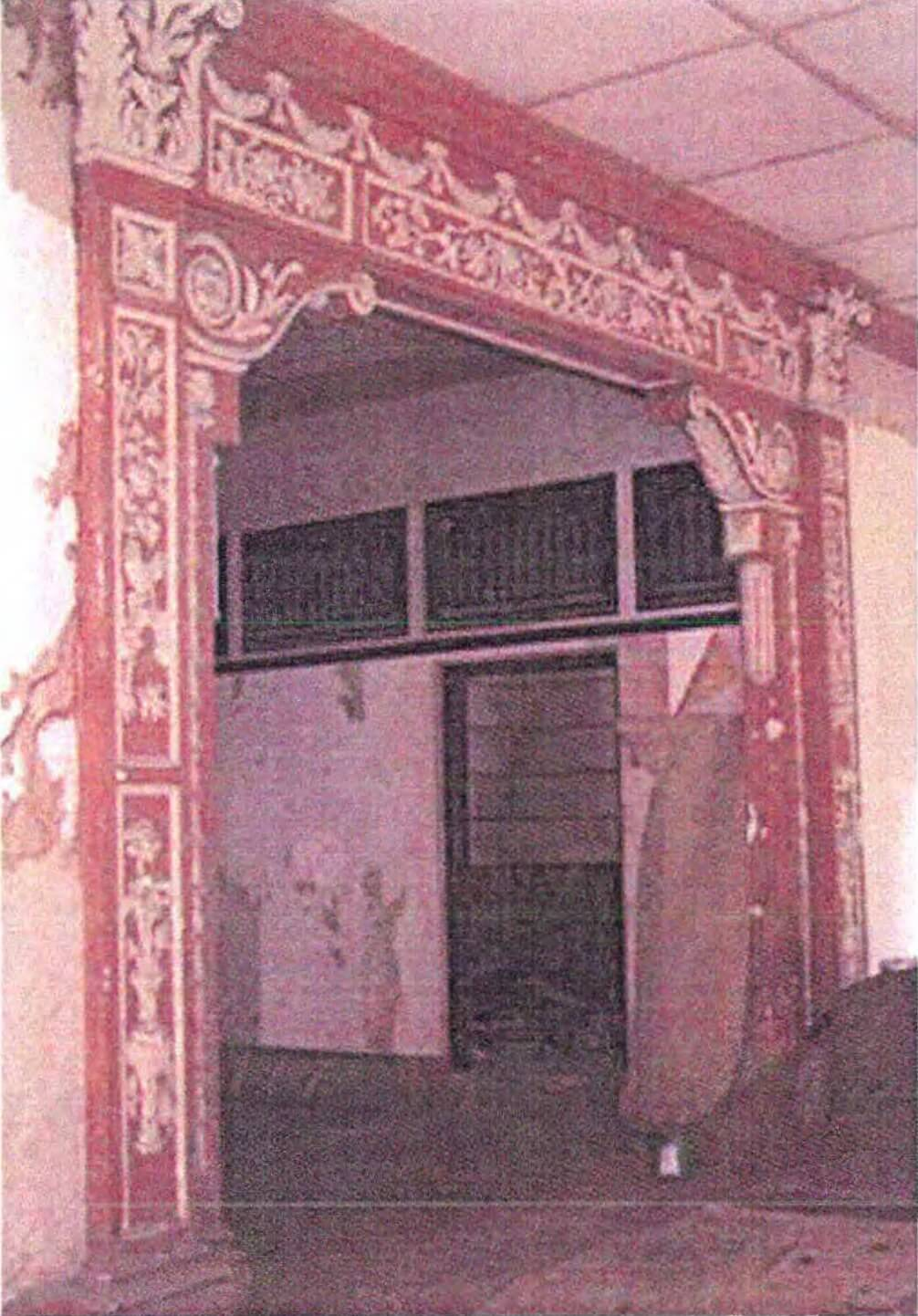
The ornate decorative doorway, known as the Buckley Arch, before its restoration.

A prominent feature is the Buckley Arch, an ornate entrance piece added after 1943 that uses symbolic Chinese art and architecture to bestow blessings upon the occupants. According to a notice within the property, its restored panels contain intricate symbolism.

- Side Panels: The lower side panels depict vases (a pun for "peace") containing a lotus, symbolizing purity and harmony, and a peony, representing wealth and rank. An upper-left panel, likely representing the male owner, portrays a rooster (symbolizing high rank and five virtues), bamboo (humility and integrity), and a chrysanthemum (longevity). An upper-right panel, thought to address the female owner, shows a phoenix (embodying warmth and five virtues), plum blossoms (perseverance and a pun for longevity), and a chrysanthemum.
- Top Panels: The three top panels depict the flowers of the four seasons to wish for peace year-round, and a combination of magpies (birds of joy) and plum blossoms that form a rebus for the idiom "joy filling one's face" (喜上眉梢, xǐ shàng méi shāo). The combined wish is for the family to be happy and live in harmony.

== Conservation and current status ==
The house at 9 Buckley Road was gazetted for conservation by the URA in 2008.

It currently functions as the exclusive clubhouse for Buckley Classique, a freehold condominium on a 71,812 square foot property. The conserved bungalow houses a gymnasium, a function room, a residents' lounge, a pool table, and an indoor children's playground. Its veranda opens onto a swimming pool.
