= Hoover Theatre =

Coordinates: 1.3249°N 103.8487°E

The Hoover Theatre, also known as the Hoover Live Cinema and the New Hoover Cinema, was a theatre located at the junction of Balestier Road and Jalan Ampas in Balestier, Singapore.

== History ==
Plans to build a theatre along Balestier Road were first announced in 1958 by Runme Shaw of the Shaw Organisation. Hoover Theatre opened in 1960, screening Chinese blockbusters and newly-released movies, as well as English movies. The theatre also screened Japanese movies during annual culture festivals that lasted from 1977-1980.

By the 1980s, attendance of the theatre had declined, and the theatre was leased off to television producer Robert Chua, who renamed it the Hoover Live Theatre. After Chua took over, the theatre stopped showing films began showing clean live shows intended for families instead. In February 1983, the theatre obtained its entertainment license, as well as its first variety show. However, by 1985, following the closure of the Petrel Live Theatre, the Rex Live Theatre, and the Sun City Live Theatre, the theatre was one of two remaining live theatres in Singapore, along with the Golden Live Theatre, and was the only one operating full-scale. The live theatre was also behind on rent, and continued to operate in spite of this. In 1989, the theatre was leased off to the His Sanctuary Services church to 1991, and the church moved into the theatre. The head of the church, Reverend Roderick Tay, did not have qualms about moving into a theatre, and believed that the theatre was an ideal location for a church.

In December 1991, the church gave up its lease on the theatre as it was looking for a more permanent place to hold services. Indian video and music cassette distributor Kavitha Video Centre leased the theatre for three years, and renamed the theatre as the New Hoover Theatre. The theatre began showing films in Tamil, Sinhalese, Malayalam and Hindi, and was the first theatre to screen Indian movies regularly.

The theatre closed in 1996, and was demolished, along with the original Shaw Plaza and President Theatre, in July 1996 to make way for Shaw Plaza-Twin Heights. The new Shaw Plaza opened in November 1999, along with the Balestier Cineplex, which replaced Hoover Theatre.
