= Shaw Plaza =

Coordinates: 1.3251°N 103.8465°E

Shaw Plaza, also known as Shaw Plaza-Twin Heights, is a mixed-use development in Balestier, Singapore.

== History ==
Shaw Plaza in 2026

The plaza was opened in 1999, replacing an earlier Shaw Plaza, which had existed for at least fourteen years. The earlier Shaw Plaza was home to the Hoover Theatre, and the President Theatre, by the Shaw Organisation. The plaza is located along Balestier Road, and contains 132 residential units on top of the shopping plaza. However, the residential units are separated from the mall. The shopping centre also included the Balestier Cineplex, which replaced the Hoover Theatre. The cineplex had six screens.

The entire complex underwent renovation works which finished in March 2023. After renovation, the new cineplex reopened with eleven screens.
