= Leng Ern Jee =

Buddhist temple

Coordinates: 1.32725°N 103.84770°E

Leng Ern Jee is a Dejiao temple located along Jalan Rajah in Balestier, Singapore.

== History ==
Originally located along Circular Road, the temple began as a shrine in the upper floor of a shophouse dedicated to Lu Dong Bin and Ji Gong during the Japanese occupation of Singapore. After World War 2, donation was collected to move the temple to Jalan Rajah. A traditional Chinese medicine clinic was opened in 1969. The main temple hall is devoted to Lu Dong Bin and Ji Gong, the rear hall is used for honouring ancestors, and the second floor is dedicated to Guanyin.

The temple is included in the Balestier Heritage Trail by the National Heritage Board.
