= Sanhe, Dabu County =

Sanhe 三河镇
- Town
- Location in Guangdong
- Coordinates: 24°24′27″N 116°34′29″E
- Country: People's Republic of China
- Province: Guangdong
- Prefecture-level city: Meizhou
- County: Dabu County
- Village-level divisions: 1 residential community 12 villages
- Elevation: 42 m (138 ft)
- Time zone: UTC+8 (China Standard)
- Postal code: 514265
- Area code: 0753

Sanhe (Chinese: 三河镇) is a town in northeastern Guangdong province, China, in the valley of the Mei River. It is under the administration of Dabu County, the seat of which is 13 kilometres (8.1 mi) to the east as the crow flies and down the road on the Guangdong Provincial Highway 333. As of 2018, it has one residential community (社区) and 12 villages under its administration.

== See also ==
- List of township-level divisions of Guangdong
