= Baihou =

Baihou Town 百侯镇
- Town
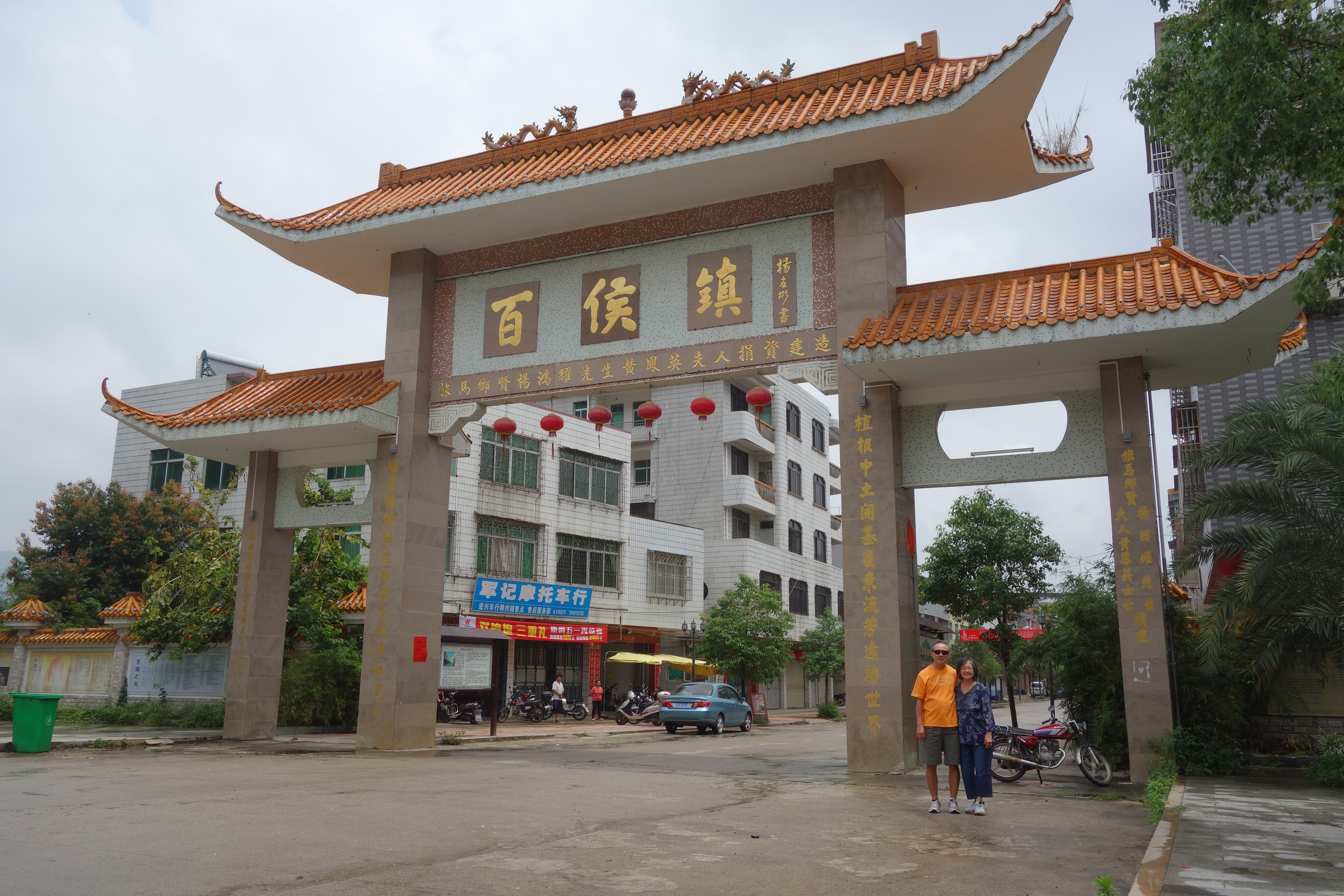

- Location within Guangdong
- Coordinates: 24°18′08″N 116°45′58″E
- Country: China
- Province: Guangdong
- Prefecture-level city: Meizhou
- County: Dabu

Population
  - Total: 17,677
- Administrative division code: 44 14 22 116

Baihou Town (simplified Chinese: 百侯镇; traditional Chinese: 百侯鎮; pinyin: Bǎihóu Zhèn) is a town under the administration of Dabu County, Meizhou, Guangdong, China.

== Administrative divisions ==
Baihou Town contains the following 14 administrative divisions:

Caonian Village (曹鲇村), Ruanqiao Village (软桥村), Jiuzhaili Village (旧寨里村), Maoshan Village (帽山村), Qutan Village (曲滩村), Hengqian Village (横乾村), Dongshan Village (东山村), Nanshan Village (南山村), Xinle Village (新乐村), Suguping Village (苏姑坪村), Wutang Village (武塘村), Bailuo Village (白罗村), Hounan Village (侯南村), and Houbei Village (侯北村).

== Chinese traditional village ==
In August 2013, Hounan Village was chosen as one of the second batch of Chinese traditional villages.

== Notable people ==
- Yang Yongsong (Hounan Village), major general in the People's Liberation Army and Communist Party politician
