= Chan Chor Min Tong =

Religious building in Balestier, Singapore

- Location within Singapore

General information
- Location: 2 Jalan Kemaman, Singapore 329318; 3 Bassein Road, Singapore 309835, Balestier, Singapore
- Coordinates: 1.324861°N 103.850359°E

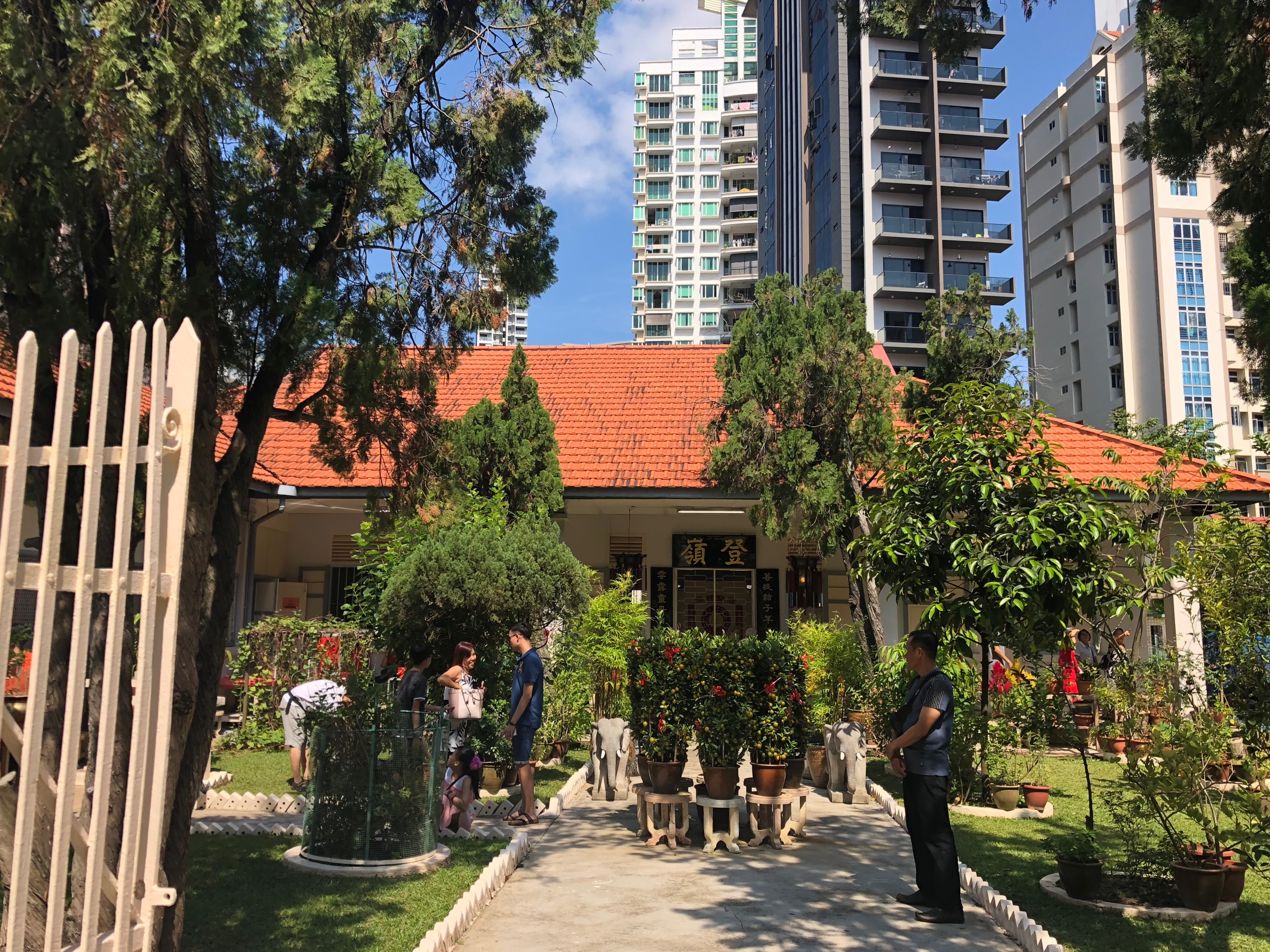
Chan Chor Min Tong at 2 Jalan Kemaman

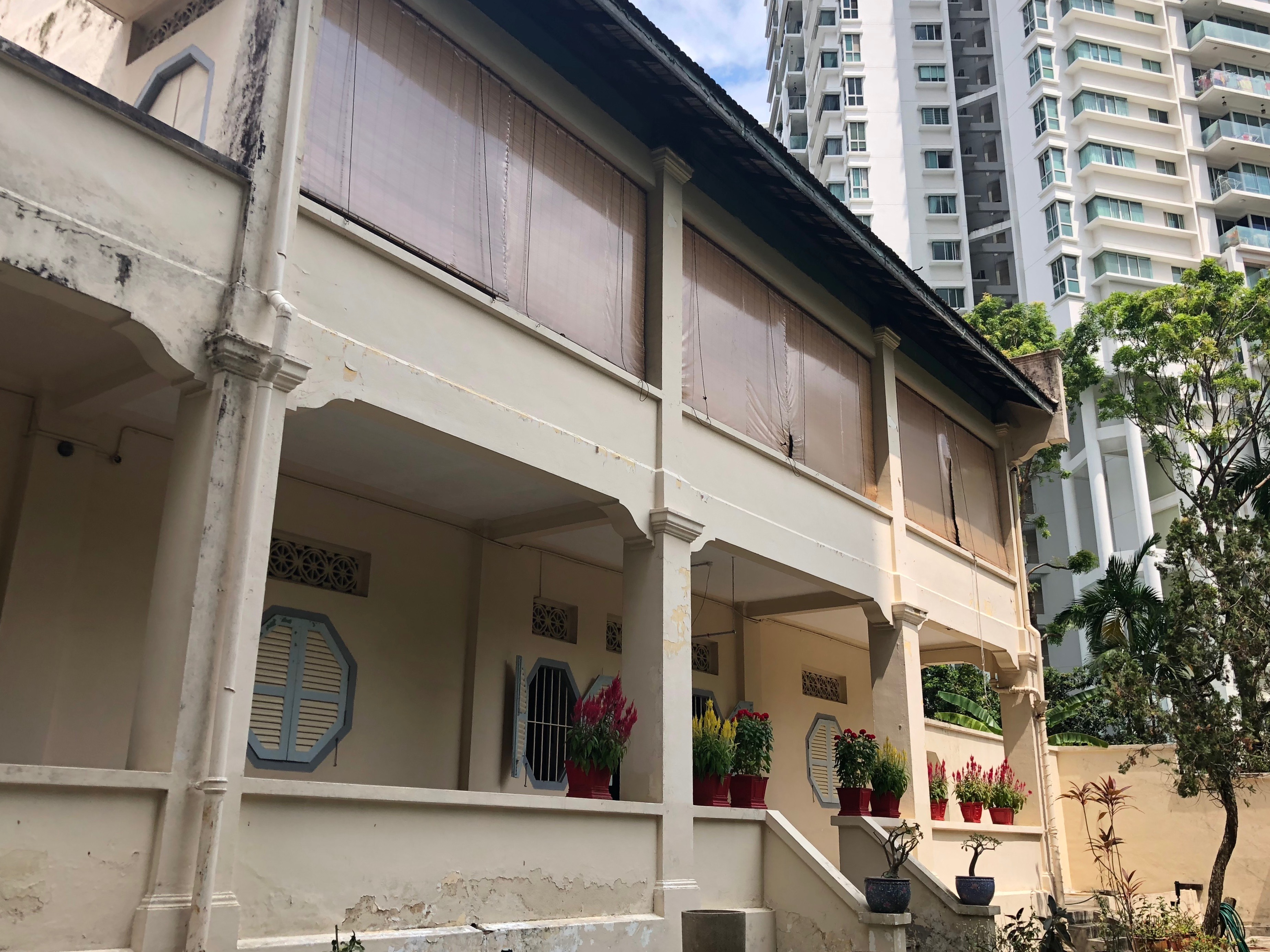
Chan Chor Min Tong at 3 Bassein Road

Chan Chor Min Tong (traditional Chinese: 陳佐勉堂) is a Buddhist vegetarian hall located in Balestier, Singapore. It is separated into two locations, one at 2 Jalan Kemaman and another at 3 Bassein Road. Built by the Cantonese philanthropist Chan Chor Min in 1926 and 1936 respectively, the hall hosted migrant Chinese workers with no family or means of support in Singapore. From being a place of lodging to now being a place of worship, Chan Chor Min Tong is significant as a representation of the vegetarian hall culture as well as the migrant origins of Singapore.

== Vegetarian halls ==
Chan Chor Min Tong was a vegetarian hall, also known as a zhaitang (齋堂). Vegetarian halls practice a form of Chinese fasting religions (齋教) that is known as the Great Way (Xiantiandao, Chinese: 先天道). This religion was a folk layman religion that was considered to be heterodox and was suppressed by China. Thus, the ideology spread to countries in South East Asia to avoid persecution. In these halls, worshippers would only consume a vegetarian diet as a form of spiritual purification and practice Buddhist rituals. However, these worshippers were not monks and were rather laymen, with one main master of the house acting as the primary caretaker.

== Context ==
Singapore faced an influx of immigrants in the early 20th century after World War I. These immigrants were the main population of Singapore's workforce and consisted of not just men but also women. These women swore off marriage and left their homes in order to find work. Unfettered by the trappings of traditional marriage, they were free to gain their independence through finding work and becoming self-sustainable. They most likely took inspiration from the 19th-century independence movement in the districts of Guangzhou, China, where the mahjie and samsui women in Singapore also originated from. Thus the majority of them were likely to speak the Cantonese dialect.

Alone, they gathered together and lived in these vegetarian halls as a community. The vegetarian halls offered a place to stay for these migrants with no homes or relationships with kin, provided that they would convert, and practice the vegetarian diet and the Buddhist rituals. They also had to remain single and abstain from sex. It was not free of charge, as they still had to find work or do chores to stay. These places established a community amongst these immigrants, bounded by their oaths to care of each other. This was important, especially since most would probably never return to their hometown again due to financial costs. As part of a community, they were assured that through old age and then in death they were not alone and that the necessary funeral rites would be performed for them.

At the same time, Balestier was also slowly evolving to be a relatively affluent residential neighborhood. This invited many wealthy philanthropists to buy land and erect religious institutions. This resulted in the creation of many Chinese religious institutions like the Thong Teck Sian Tong Lian Sin Sia Buddhist-Taoist temple and the Fei Hsia Tsing She Buddhist temple in Balestier.

== History ==
In 1926, Chan Chor Min Tong was founded by Master Chan Chor Min. The first temple was a one-story terrace house built at 2 Jalan Kemaman Rd and housed migrant men. A decade later in 1936, the second temple was built as a two-storey terrace house at 3 Bassein Road. This temple housed the migrant women instead.

In the 1940s just before World War II, the old master Chan died, and the current master took over his duties.

During the 1960s–1970s, the last residents in both halls have all died and Chan Chor Min Tong ceased being a place for lodging.

== Present day ==
Today, both halls are maintained by a trust as religious halls, and only opens its doors to visitors during Chinese New Year. The Jalan Kemaman site is only open on the 3rd day of the Chinese New Year, while the Bassein Rd site is open for the first 3 days.

The visitors are usually the elderly who have been coming for decades, as well as their families. Many of the adults there are also continuing the tradition. They were brought to the temple by their parents, and are now bringing children of their own there as well. As Chan Chor Min Tong is mainly a Cantonese enclave, most of the visitors converse in Cantonese as well.

At Jalan Kemanan, visitors would first enter the compound and make their way past the garden and into the side of the house. They offer their prayers to Guanyin the Goddess of Mercy, through offerings and joss sticks for their wishes such as wealth and good studies in the coming year. After, they proceed to the back where they pay their respects to the deceased past master of the house. Following, visitors crawl under the offering table in a tradition unique to the temple. Devotees believe in that crawling under the table would bring them good fortune in the coming year, and even encourage visitors to repeat this three times for extra luck. After which, they proceed back to the main altar where they pray and drink holy water in front of the current master of the house. Visitors are also treated to vegetarian food cooked by the temple volunteers. Visitors will be seated around a table with other strangers and be served yusheng, vegetarian bee hoon and noodles.

At Bassein Road, most visitors arrive on the first day, and the number slowly dwindles by the third day in which it becomes mostly quiet. Just like at Jalan Kemanan, one pays their respect to Guanyin and the old masters of the house.

== Future ==
Chan Chor Min Tong is currently managed by a trust, which would decide the future of both buildings. It is situated in a prime location of Balestier. All around the Bassein Road site, high-rise condominiums tower over the two-storey terrace house, hiding it away from view. Several visitors to the Jalan Kemanan temple have also been turned away by rumors that the Bassein Road site had been demolished and have since stopped visiting. Devotees volunteer to take care of the place for short periods of time but do not reside there anymore. Most of them are also retirees. Many of the visitors are also aged, while the place is unheard of by the younger generation, so the number of visitors may dwindle over time. As such, although it brings together the community of worshippers, it is still at risk of being demolished if the trust someday decides to sell it.

== Architecture ==
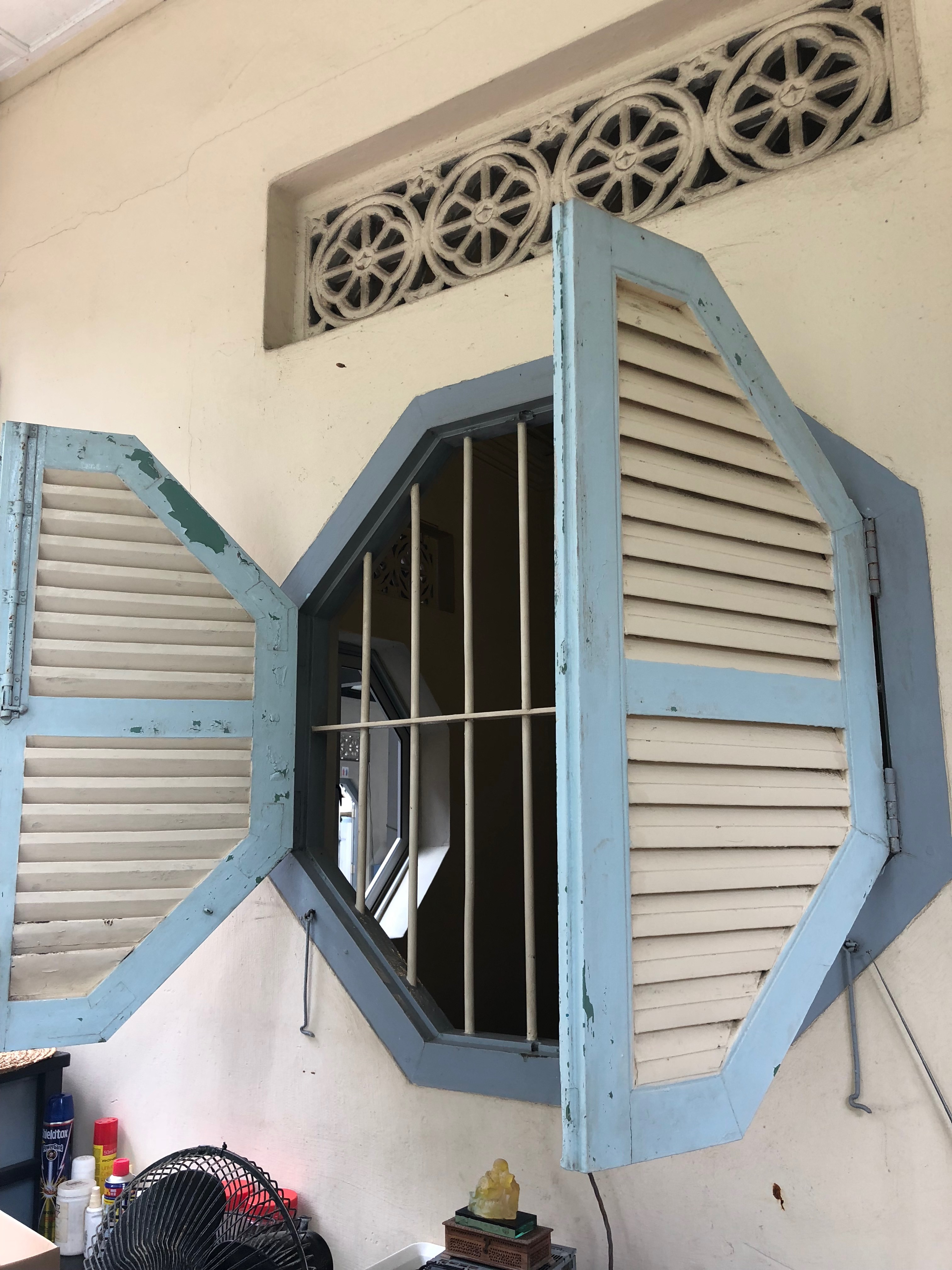
Wide usage of octagonal windows to represent the bagua in Taoism and provide ventilation

The building at Jalan Kemaman is a one-story L-shaped house. It features a garden in the front containing plants that are commonly used for tropical remedies. It houses the shrine to Guanyin in the side wing, while the main shrine to the hall sits at the back. According to the elderly visitors, the roof used to be made of attap while the path was made of mud. The site has recently undergone renovations, with the roof replaced by a pitched roof and the paths paved with concrete.

The Bassein Road house was built as a two-storey terrace house. The building is made of two houses separated by a courtyard with a connecting corridor. In the building, wide walkways and large living spaces exhibit the function of the house as a communal space. It also features a traditional kitchen and a garden. The use of the number eight in its architecture is also very prominent. The windows are octagonal in shape, and the double doors in the four walls in the courtyard adds up to eight. This would probably tie into the bagua philosophy in Taoism.

Tropical considerations were also built in place, with both buildings featuring perforated windows as well as high ceilings and doorways that allow for ventilation. At Bassein Rd, Linoleum also lines the second floor and insulates against the bare concrete that rapidly loses heat at night.
