= Kwek Hong Png =

Singaporean businessperson

- Born: 1912
- Died: November 8, 1994 (aged 81–82)

Chinese name
- Traditional Chinese: 郭芳楓
- Simplified Chinese: 郭芳枫
- Hokkien POJ: Koeh Hong-png
Transcriptions
Standard Mandarin
- Hanyu Pinyin: Guō Fāngfēng
Southern Min
- Hokkien POJ: Koeh Hong-png

Kwek Hong Png (Note: simplified Chinese: 郭芳枫; traditional Chinese: 郭芳楓; Pe̍h-ōe-jī: Koeh Hong-png; pinyin: Guō Fāngfēng) (1912 – 8 November 1994) was a Singaporean businessperson, known for establishing Hong Leong Group, of which he was also chairperson. Kwek became one of the world's richest men, with an estimated net worth of S$3 billion before his retirement in 1984.

== Early life ==
Born in 1912 in Fujian's Tung Ann district to a miserly farmer, Kwek arrived in Singapore in 1928 from Fujian. He first started out as a shop helper at his brother-in-law's hardware firm. His monthly salary then was just $5 and he reportedly slept on the floors of the store. During World War II, Kwek became rich by trading construction materials. He also participated in smuggling basic goods and traded with Japanese merchants.

== Personal life ==
In August 1943, Kwek purchased the House at 9 Buckley Road, a 1932 bungalow where he and his family subsequently resided. A decorative Chinese-style entrance archway was added to the property during their time there. The house was later acquired by City Developments Limited, the property arm of Kwek's Hong Leong Group, and was conserved in 2008 to serve as the clubhouse for a new "Buckley Classique" condominium development on the site.

== Career ==
Founded in 1941, the Hong Leong Group was originally a trading company that supplied basic construction materials and rubber. Wanting to work as a team, Kwek subsequently beckoned his three brothers to join Hong Leong. Becoming chairman of the organisation in 1956, Kwek retired in 1984; before that, his net worth was estimated by Forbes to be worth S$3 billion. He was also ranked one of the wealthiest men in the world by Forbes.

== Lawsuit ==
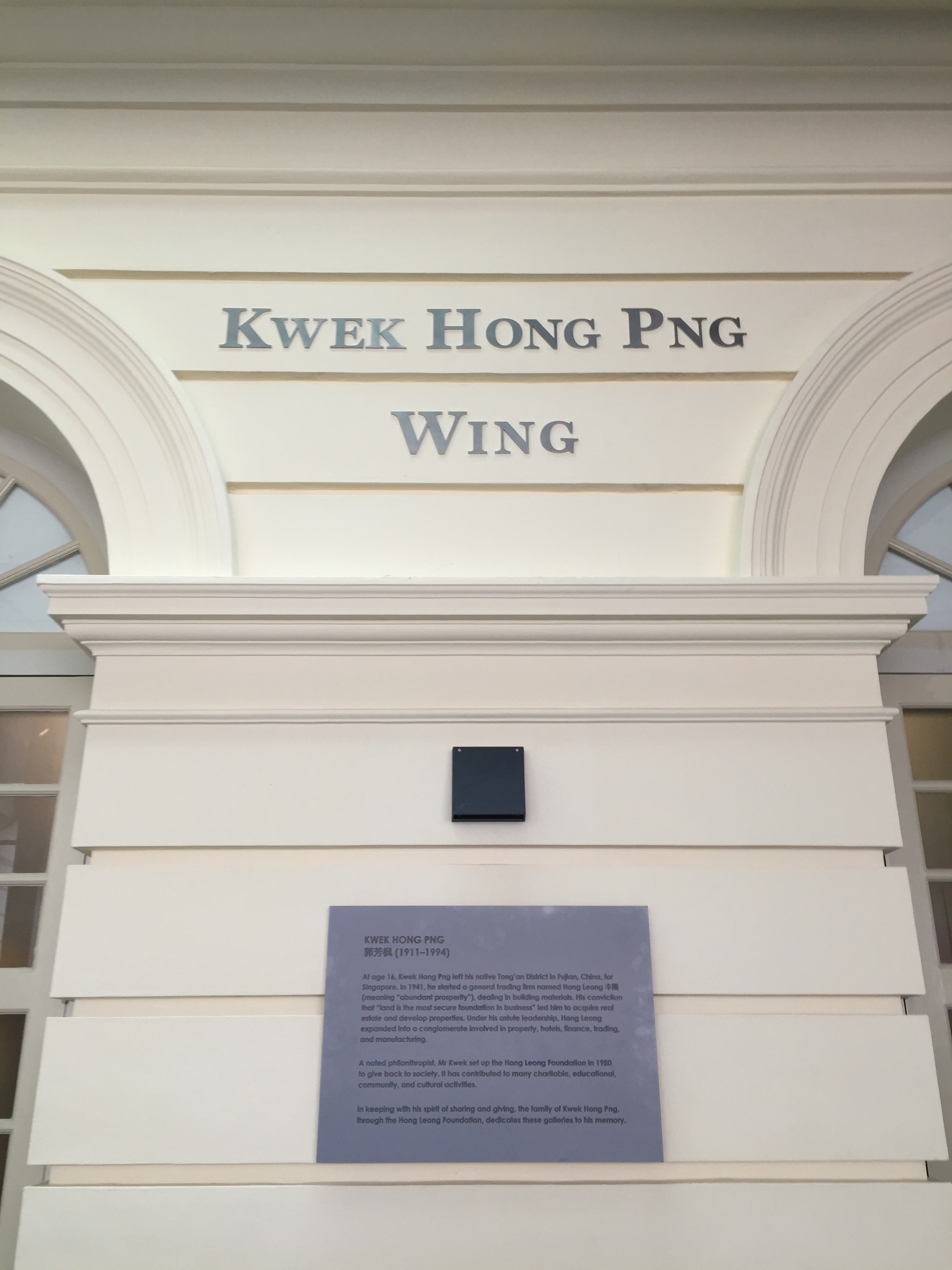
The Kwek Hong Png Wing of the Asian Civilisations Museum opened in 2015

In November 1989, a lawsuit was filed against Kwek for the misuse of funds as well as abetment. Represented by G. P. Selvam, Kwek was later found guilty of the charges, with a pending charge of "dishonestly receiving stolen property". Kwek was later allowed bail set at a million dollars. Kwek's passport was also seized as a precaution.

== Death and legacy ==
Kwek died in 1994, aged 82. Louis Kraar of Fortune described Kwek as "Singapore's leading developer". His empire was later inherited by his son, Kwek Leng Beng.

In 2003 a gallery displaying Chinese artefacts at the Asian Civilisations Museum was named after Kwek, and in 2015, following renovations to the museum, a new wing called the Kwek Hong Png Wing was opened.
