= Tai Pei Yuen =

Buddhist temple in Balestier, Singapore

Coordinates: 1.3271°N 103.8489°E

Tai Pei Yuen is a Buddhist temple located along Jalan Kemaman in Balestier, Singapore.

== History ==
Originally known as the Kuan Yin lodge, the temple was built on 7 Jalan Kemaman in 1938 by Chow Siew Keng, who migrated from Guangdong, China to Singapore in 1936. The original temple only included two wooden houses, as well as a statue of Guanyin. Following Chow's death in 1958, her daughter Poon Sin Kiew, took over as the temple's chief abbess under the title Venerable Sek Fatt Kuan. In 1964, the lodge was replaced by a different building. In 1980, a free clinic was established in the temple, with 16 doctors and 15 nurses.

In 1984, the temple donated either 5,000 or 6,000 rice dumplings to welfare homes. Fatt Kuan presented the dumplings to Teo Cheong Tee, the parliamentary secretary for the Ministry of Community Development, at the Woodlands Home for the Aged. From there, the dumplings were distributed to welfare homes. Fatt Kuan died on 26 August 2002, with hundreds of people entering the temple to pay their respects to her.

The temple has been included in the Balestier Heritage Trail.
