= Sim Kwong Ho shophouses =

- Sim Kwong Ho shophouses in 2026

General information
- Status: Conserved
- Type: Shophouses
- Architectural style: Singapore Eclectic, Chinese Baroque
- Location: 230 & 246 Balestier Road, Balestier, Singapore
- Coordinates: 1.3234°N 103.8523°E
- Completed: 1926

The Sim Kwong Ho shophouses are a row of shophouses located on the corner of Balestier Road and Kim Keat Road.

== History ==
Constructed in 1926, the Sim Kwong Ho shophouses were designed by architectural firm Westerhout & Oman, and built on 292-310 Balestier Road, by Sim Cheng Neo, who lived on 503 Balestier Road. The row of shophouses are known as the Sim Kwong Ho Shophouses due to the Chinese characters on the side of the shophouses, which read "Sim Kwong Ho". The style in which the shophouses are built is known as Singapore Eclectic or Chinese Baroque. The walls of the shophouses are covered with European glazed floral tiles, with carvings of birds, flowers, bats and mythical beasts. There was formerly a centrepiece, which was taken down for unknown reasons.

The shophouses have been included in the Balestier Heritage Trail by the National Heritage Board.
