= Sun City Live Theatre =

Singaporean live theatre (closed 1983)

Coordinates: 1.3072°N 103.8248°E

Sun City Live Theatre was the only English-language live theatre in Singapore, located in the Orchard Towers.

== History ==
Sun City Live Theatre was a theatre on the fourth floor of the Orchard Towers. The only English-language live theatre in Singapore, it replaced the Petrel Live Theatre on 25 May 1983. The theatre was owned by Jasper Productions. The main act of the theatre was originally supposed to include ten male actors from a mime troupe, choreographed by Charles van Geun, impersonating several stars such as Liza Minnelli, Diana Ross, Dolly Parton and Marilyn Monroe, besides performing traditional dances from Thai, Japanese and Korean cultures. However, the act was cancelled, as authorities deemed the act unsuitable for Singaporean audiences.

As the main act was cancelled, the theatre failed to attract tour groups, with fewer than ten people showing up on some nights. After the mime troupe's two-month contract had expired, the theatre closed down on 31 July 1983.
