= 49 Moonstone Lane =

Historic warehouse in Balestier, Singapore

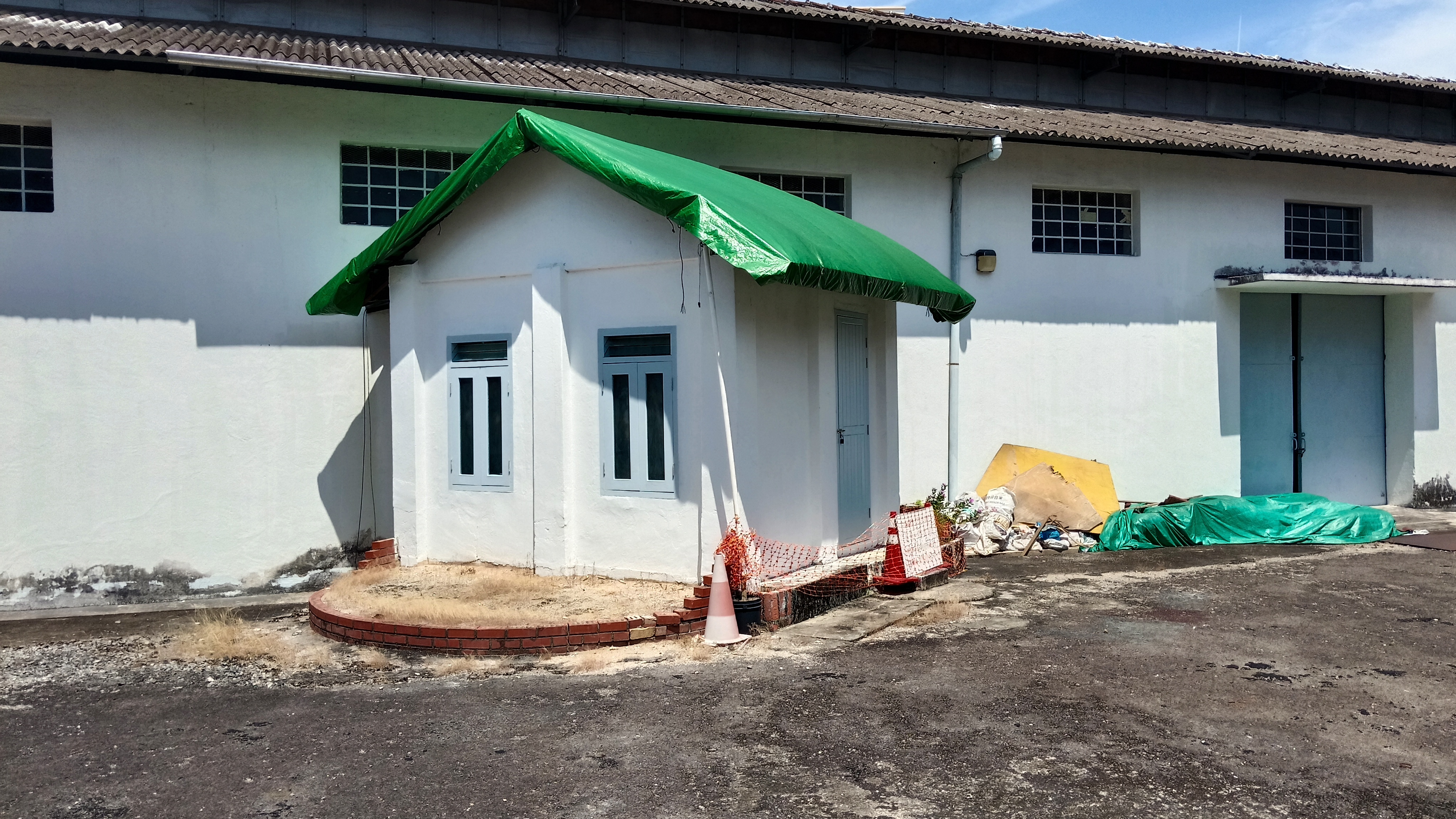
- The mausoleum and shrine, or keramat of Sharifah Zainah embedded to the northern wall of the warehouse.
- Interactive map of 49 Moonstone Lane
- Singapore 1°19′39″N 103°51′56″E
- Type: Godown
- Location: Balestier, Singapore

History
- Built: 1950
- Built for: Bachoo Singh

Site notes
- Architectural style: Modern architecture
- Governing body: Urban Redevelopment Authority

49 Moonstone Lane is a five-unit warehouse located near Balestier, Singapore. The warehouse was built in 1950 by Bachoo Singh, an Indian businessman. It is an unofficial heritage site along the Kallang River and contains an Islamic tomb that dates back to pre-WWII times.

== History ==
49 Moonstone Lane was originally a plot of land situated next to the congregational mosque of Kampong Marican, a primarily Arab Muslim settlement in colonial Singapore. After the Second World War, an Indian trader and local entrepreneur named Bachoo Singh purchased the plot of land, utilizing it to build a five-unit warehouse in 1950. It was formerly used as a cattle shed, but later converted into a godown for the storage of rice and grains. The warehouse also received its current name in late April 1952. After the death of Bachoo Singh sometime in the late 20th century, ownership of 49 Moonstone Lane was relegated to the now independent government of Singapore, although merchants were occasionally allowed to lease the property.

An anonymous Muslim grave that had existed on the site prior to 1940 was incorporated into the building as part of Singh's warehouse. Singh, a devout Hindu, reportedly took care of the tomb and made arrangements to enshrine and embed the grave into his warehouse, out of respect for the deceased. Revered as a keramat by locals, the tomb was slated for exhumation in March 2019 by the Majlis Ugama Islam Singapura (MUIS), with the guarantee that it would be reinterred in the Pusara Abadi Muslim Cemetery. However, exhumation of the grave was delayed on 26 March 2019 for further observations to be made at the site. Local heritage researchers, including Dr Imran Tajuddeen, managed to uncover the identity of the tomb's occupant, a Muslim woman named Sharifah Zainah who was related to prominent mystic and Islamic sage, Habib Noh. The tomb was also one of two shrines dedicated to female relatives of the sage, the other being the shrine of Sharifah Rogayah at Duxton Plain Park.

In 2026, the warehouse became an unofficial heritage site of the Kallang River area, featured in tours and walking trails in said place.

== Transportation ==
The nearest form of transport to 49 Moonstone Lane is the bus stop for Moonstone Lane itself, although the warehouse and shrine are located only 800 metres from Potong Pasir MRT station on the North–East MRT line.

== See also ==
- 38 Oxley Road
- Muslim cemeteries in Singapore
