= Balestier =

- Subzone of Novena Planning Area

Name transcription(s)
  - Chinese: 马里士他
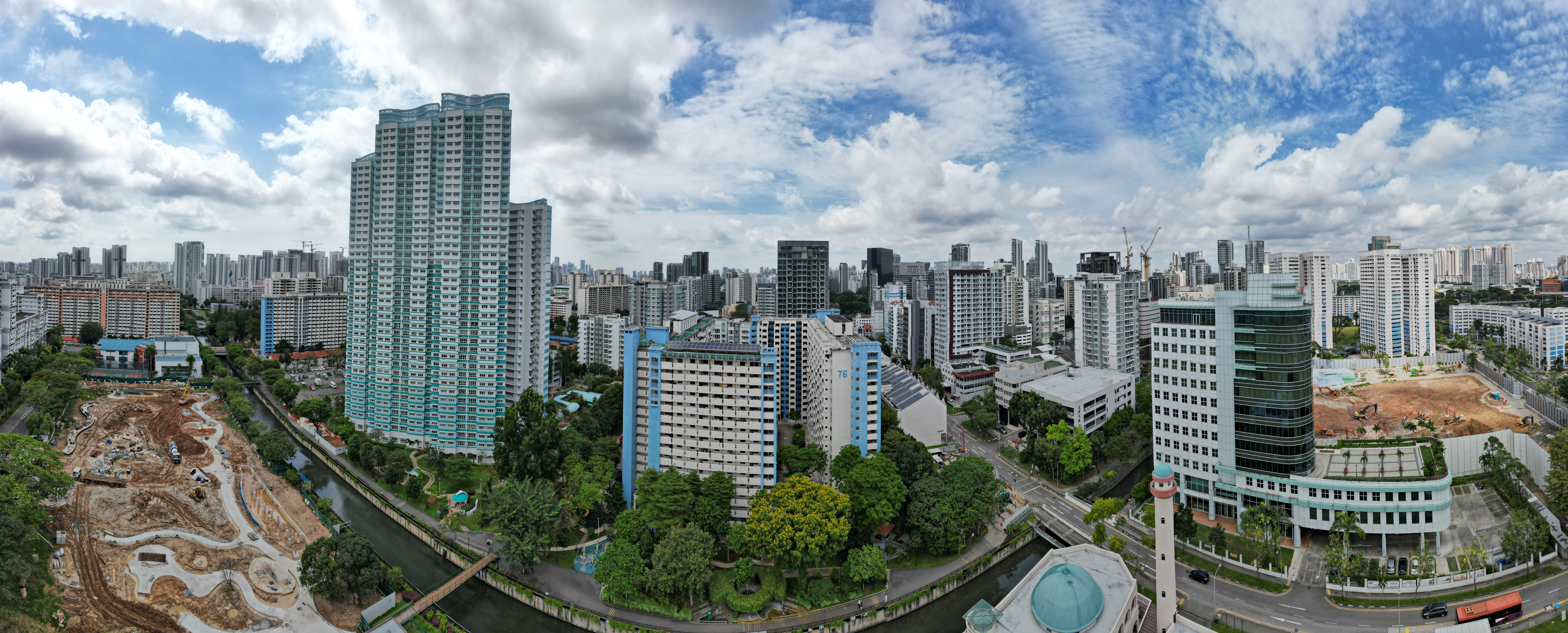
- From top left to right: Aerial panorama of Balestier and Sungei Whampoa, Balestier Road, Goh Chor Tua Pek Kong Temple, Balestier Art Deco shophouses, Sim Kwong Ho shophouses

- Location of Balestier within Singapore
- Coordinates: 1.32506°N 103.85054°E
- Country: Singapore

Area
  - Total: 1.92 km^{2} (0.74 sq mi)

Population (2026)
  - Total: 32,910
  - Density: 17,100/km^{2} (44,400/sq mi)

Balestier (traditional Chinese: 馬里士他; simplified Chinese: 马里士他) is a sub zone located in the planning area of Novena in the Central Region of Singapore. The main road, Balestier Road, links Thomson Road to Serangoon Road and the road continues on as Lavender Street. The area is home to rows of shophouses, such as the Sim Kwong Ho shophouses, the Balestier Art Deco shophouses, 49 Moonstone Lane, and 601-639 Balestier Road, low-rise apartments and commercial buildings as well as a shopping mall known as Shaw Plaza. Balestier also has another mall, Zhongshan Mall. There are several lighting and electrical shops along Balestier Road, which is also home to the Ceylon Sports Club and the Indian Association. The area is known for its food such as bak kut teh and chicken rice. In the area, there are several apartments, condominiums, and budget hotels.

== Etymology and history ==
The precinct was named after Joseph Balestier. As new settlers populated Balestier Road from the late 19th century, they established villages and grew crops such as lime and taro.

In the 1830s, Joseph Balestier established Balestier Plain, a sugarcane plantation.

Balestier hired a number of immigrants on his estates. Chinese and Indian workers laboured these crops. When Balestier left Singapore due to ill health after the deaths of his son and wife in 1844 and 1847, he sold his plantation to Singapore authorities in 1848 and the land was leased out to Chinese farmers. Another portion was turned into a burial site for paupers and lepers. During the 19th century, many prisoners from India were sent to Singapore, where they were employed as labourers and builders. After serving their term, many of these convicts remained in Singapore as traders, artisans or skilled craftsmen. With a large diversity of people, different skills, culture, techniques and practices were shared and exchange within Balestier.

The government obtained Balestier's estate and leased a portion of it to Chinese farmers while another segment was turned into a burial area for patients from Tan Tock Seng Hospital. Due to the good condition of the soil and a proper irrigation system left over from the previous plantation, the new residents who moved into Balestier were able to establish their villages and new plantations such as taro, lime, and sugarcane. As Balestier became more reputable, tradesmen and merchants started to emerge, operating shophouses and selling their wares along the main road, turning Balestier Road into one of the busiest streets in Singapore.

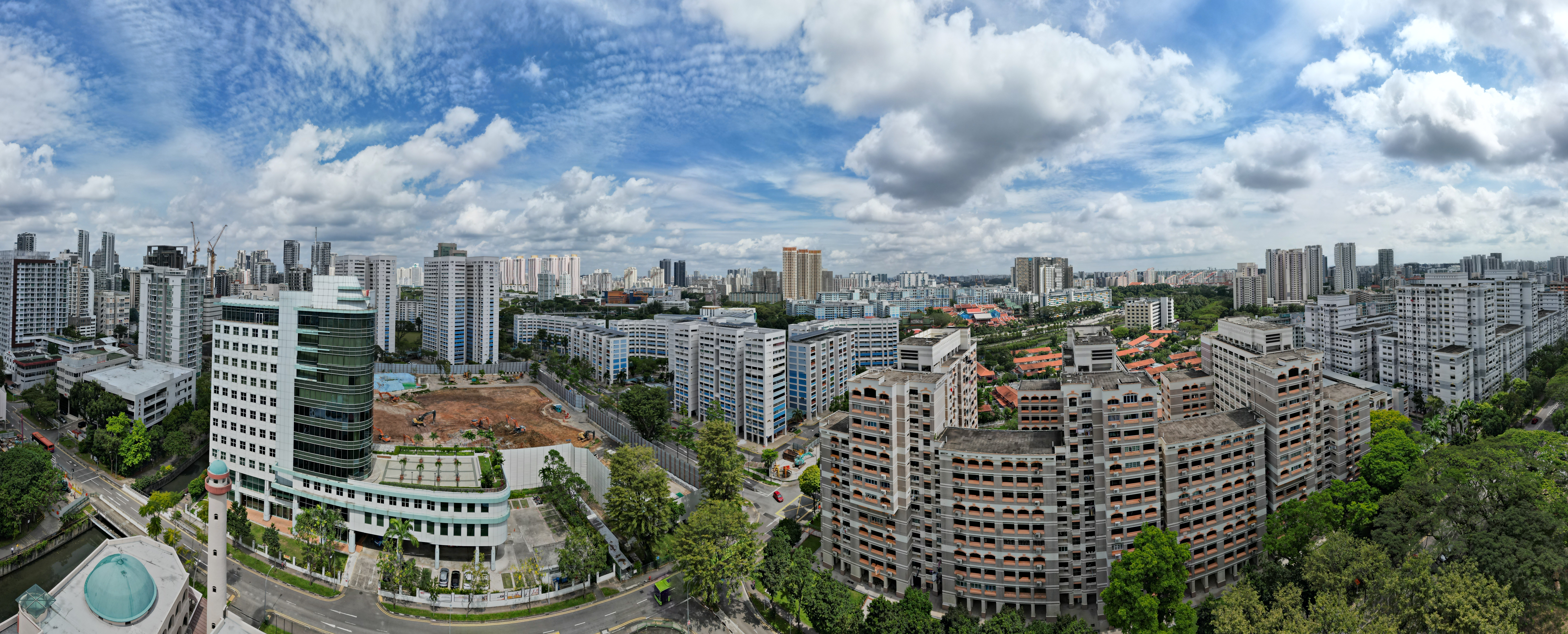
Balestier and the NKF centre aerial panorama taken in February 2023

For instance, the nickname “Recreation Road” is made popular with the growth of many sporting and recreational buildings within the vicinity in 1920s. Other examples of names given in view of activities included the Cantonese names such as Wu-hap Thong was given to the Taro pond, which is to depict the semi aquatic crops grown within the neighbourhood. The area that surrounds Balestier and Serangoon road also adopts the Malay language name of “Pauper House”, to acknowledge the presence of Tan Tock Seng pauper's Hospital to provide treatment for the under-privileged. Many more streets took on Malay names in acknowledgement to the existence of Malay kampong villages within the area.

In 1958, the landscape of Balestier was changed into mixed tree cultivation, coconut plantation, and grassland. Sungei Whampoa had already been canalised.

Both the Singapore Improvement Trust and the Housing and Development Board built flats in the area known as St. Michael's Estate. Modern shophouses were erected in the 1960s as well including walk-up apartments. In the late 20th century, several buildings made way for newer buildings such as high-rise condominiums, shopping malls and new commercial buildings.

The Sultan of Sulu used to own a house along Balestier Road purchased in 1903.

== Places of Worship ==
The Chinese labourers, who settled in the area, built a temple in 1847 which still exists known as Goh Chor Tua Pek Kong Temple (梧槽大伯公廟), with the area having one of the last free-standing wayang stage in Singapore that was built in 1906 by Tan Boo Liat, a wealthy Hokkien Peranakan philanthropist and community leader.

Apart from the century-old Goh Chor Tua Pek Kong Temple (梧槽大伯公廟), Balestier area also consisted of various prominent temples including Balestier Kwan Im Tng Temple (坤德觀音堂), Leng Ern Jee, Feeha Cheng Seah (飛霞精舍), Chan Chor Min Tong, Tai Pei Yuen along Jalan Kemaman and Burmese Buddhist Temple at Tai Gin Road. Thong Teck Sian Tong Lian Sin Sia Temple (同德善堂念心社), a Teochew charitable temple whose mission is the practice of compassion through the provision of free medical consultation, funeral services, and assistance to the poor and needy. The temple is also known for its tradition of setting up water and tea kiosks for thirsty passers-by at the junction of Boon Teck Road and Balestier Road since 1950s.

== Notable landmarks ==
=== Malay Film Productions ===
In the 1940s, a film studio, Singapore Film Studios, was set up by Shaw Brothers to produce Malay films in Singapore for their local clients. The studio was later renamed as Malay Film Productions and had played a significant role in the film industry and produced hundreds of film. During World War II, the studio was utilized by the Japanese to broadcast propaganda films. It was later reopened after the war in 1947, but was eventually closed in 1967 due to the falling demand for Malay language films. The studio is considered one of the most iconic places in Singapore in the early days as a form of local entertainment.

=== Shaw Plaza ===
The site of Shaw Plaza, formerly known as Shaw Plaza-Twin Heights, used to sit two cinemas, the President and Hoover theaters. Hoover Theatre, which opened in 1960, was a favourite for fans of the Shaw Brothers’ gong-fu films during the sixties and seventies. In 1973, President Theatre was built. In 1996, both Hoover and President theatres were demolished to make way for Shaw Plaza, a residential cum commercial mixed use development.

Shaw Plaza underwent renovation works in 2019 and reopened in March 2023.

=== Art deco shophouses ===
Shophouses in Singapore are constructed beginning in the nineteenth century by Chinese and other communities. There is the use of brick “party walls”. A further characteristic of this urban form was the width of the shophouses were generally determined by the distance it could span due to the use of timber beams between brick party walls.

Unadorned shophouses, including those at 49 Moonstone Lane, went from simple looking to elaborate and sophisticated structures. A rapid spread of classical architecture began during the Industrial Revolution. There are the Early Shophouse style, First transitional style, late shophouse style, second transitional style, Art Deco style, and Modern shophouse style. Unlike the traditional or 2nd transitional shophouses style which have abundance ornamentation, art deco evolves from it into a new style of architecture. The primary stylistic features of an art deco shophouse are the vertical emphasis and concrete as a common material in construction to achieve smooth surfaces.

The shophouse's internal spatial layout is consistent despite the change in style during the 19th century.

== Balestier Market & Food Centre ==
Balestier Market was built in 1922 as a wet market, a basic concrete platform, where street-side fresh food vendors could occupy a lot and sell their goods without obstructing traffic. It was also known as Or Kio Pa Sat (“black bridge market” in Hokkien), named after a dark timber bridge spanning across nearby Sungei Whampoa. Another local name for the market was Tee Pa Sat (“Iron Market” in Hokkien) as the market was surrounded by a metal fence.

Despite being located a distance from other landmarks, the market was popular with the locals. Besides selling fresh produce, live poultry and frogs were slaughtered in the market for customers. About two dozen stalls existed in the market with hawkers outside the market selling various cooked food.

In 1925, a roof was added to the market.

During the Japanese occupation of Singapore in World War II, the market served as a food ration distribution centre.

In 1952, the marker was upgraded to house more stalls and its hygiene improved.

In 1999, Balestier Market was renovated. As Balestier was undergoing redevelopment into a commercial, industrial and private residential district, residents relocated out of Balestier. This reduced the patronage of the market, resulting stallowners to retire or relocate to other markets. With lesser choices of food, business at Balestier Market further reduced with patrons moving to nearby Whampoa Market instead.

In 2003, due to its historical and cultural significance, Balestier Market was placed under the Conservational Act by the Urban Redevelopment Authority and subsequently, plans were made by the authority to further modernize the market.

In 2004, the market was closed for redevelopment and was bought over by Banquet Holdings Pte Ltd. It was later converted into a food center and was reopened in June 2006.

Balestier Market houses hawkers who were from markets which were either demolished, undergoing renovation or relocated. Many of these stallholders were from Upper Thomson's Long House and Lavender Food Square.

In April 2013, Balestier Market & Food Centre is managed by KNC Global Pte Ltd, a subsidiary under KTC Group. In 2025, Balestier Market & Food Centre was granted a two-year tenancy extension.
