= Dabu County =

Dabu 大埔县
- County
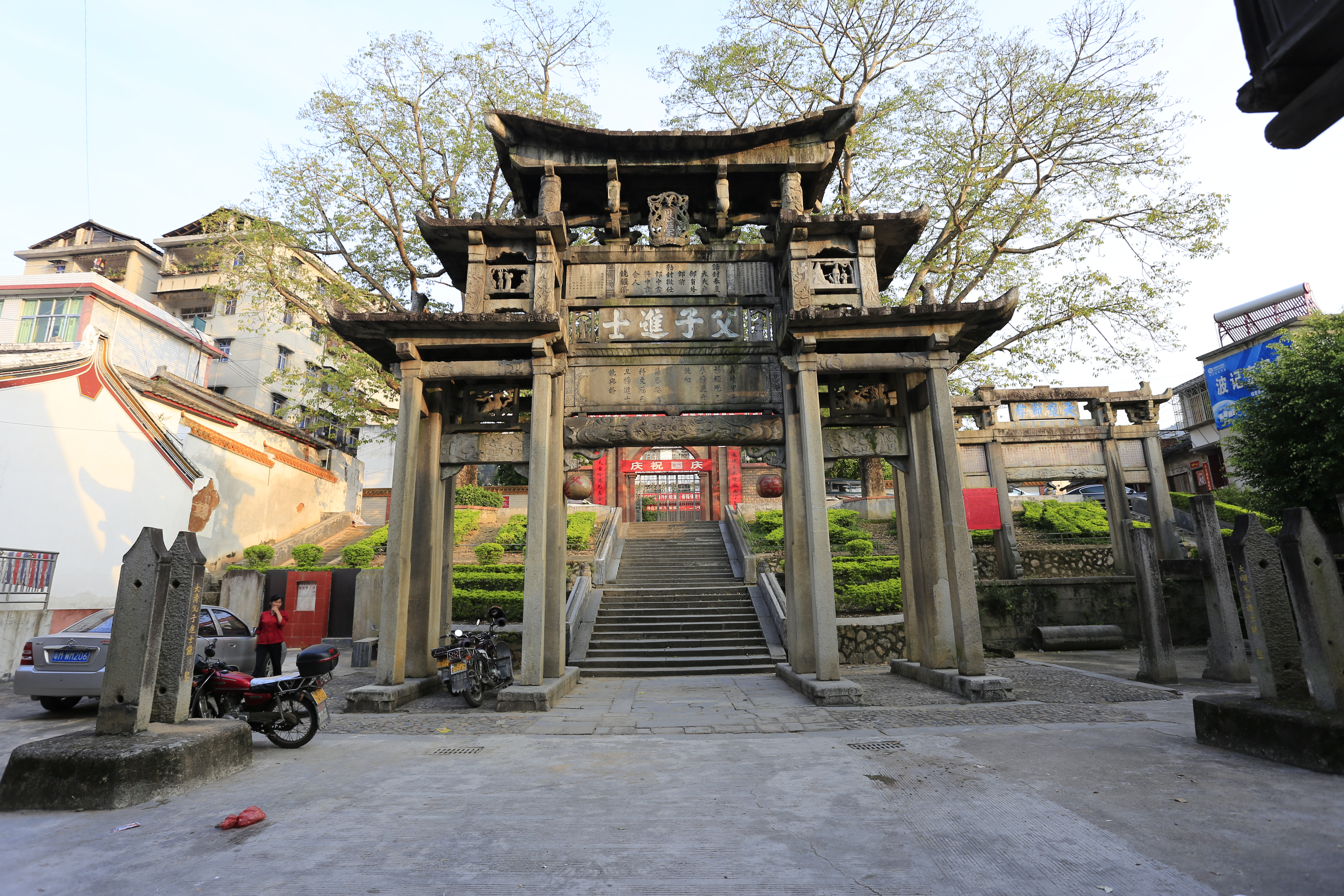
- Paifang with "父子進士" (Fathers and sons achieved the rank of "Jinshi") inscribed on it

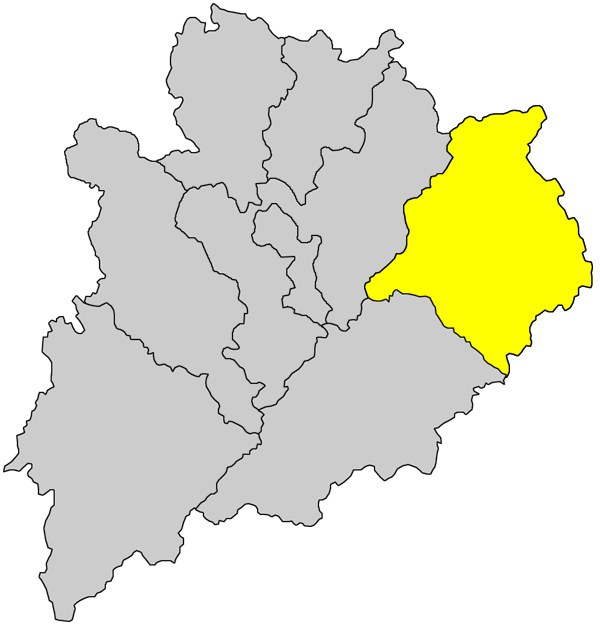
- Location in Meizhou

- Location of the seat in Guangdong
- Coordinates: 24.348°N 116.695°E
- Country: People's Republic of China
- Province: Guangdong
- Prefecture-level city: Meizhou

Area
  - Total: 2,470 km^{2} (950 sq mi)

Population (2020)
  - Total: 330,948
  - Density: 134/km^{2} (347/sq mi)
- Time zone: UTC+8 (China Standard)
- Website: www.dabu.gov.cn

Dabu County
- Simplified Chinese: 大埔县
- Traditional Chinese: 大埔縣
Transcriptions
Standard Mandarin
- Hanyu Pinyin: Dàbù Xiàn
Hakka
- Romanization: Thai-phû-yen
Yue: Cantonese
- Jyutping: Daai6 Bou3 Jyun6

Alternative Chinese name
- Chinese: 大埔
Transcriptions
Standard Mandarin
- Hanyu Pinyin: Dàbù
Hakka
- Romanization: Thai-phû
Yue: Cantonese
- Jyutping: Daai6 Bou3

Dabu County (Chinese: 大埔县) is a county in Meizhou City, in the east of Guangdong Province, China. A center of Hakka culture, it has a population of 375,000.

Dabu County has a long history of human settlement. The county was established in 413 in the Eastern Jin Dynasty. During the Qin and Han Dynasties, Dabu was under the administration of Jieyang County.

== Notable people ==
Dabu County is the ancestral home of many notable overseas Chinese, including the founding heads of state of Guyana and Singapore.

The first President of Guyana Arthur Chung traces his ancestry to Dabu. His appointment was particularly significant as Indians form majority ethnic group in Guyana.

70% of Singapore's 300,000-strong Hakka community are descended from emigrants from Dabu County, including the great-grandfather of Singapore's founding father and first Prime Minister Lee Kuan Yew.

== Ethno-linguistic make-up ==
Dabu is noted for its large Hakka population.

== Administrative divisions ==
Dabu County has jurisdiction over the following towns:

- Huliao (湖寮镇)
- Gaopi (高陂镇)
- Chayang (茶阳镇)
- Dama (大麻镇)
- Sanhe (三河镇)
- Yinjiang (银江镇)
- Guangde (光德镇)
- Taoyuan (桃源镇)
- Fenglang (枫朗镇)
- Dadong (大东镇)
- Xihe (西河镇)
- Qingxi (青溪镇)
- Zhourui (洲瑞镇)
- Baihou (百侯镇)

The administrative center of the county was originally in the ancient town of Chayang before moving to Huliao.

== Climate ==
Climate data for Dabu, elevation 237 m (778 ft), (1991–2020 normals, extremes 1967–present)
Month	Jan	Feb	Mar	Apr	May	Jun	Jul	Aug	Sep	Oct	Nov	Dec	Year
Record high °C (°F)	28.9 (84.0)	31.4 (88.5)	32.8 (91.0)	35.9 (96.6)	36.8 (98.2)	37.7 (99.9)	39.8 (103.6)	38.6 (101.5)	37.0 (98.6)	38.0 (100.4)	34.4 (93.9)	30.7 (87.3)	39.8 (103.6)
Mean daily maximum °C (°F)	19.3 (66.7)	20.7 (69.3)	23.2 (73.8)	27.1 (80.8)	30.3 (86.5)	32.4 (90.3)	34.3 (93.7)	33.9 (93.0)	32.5 (90.5)	29.5 (85.1)	25.7 (78.3)	20.9 (69.6)	27.5 (81.5)
Daily mean °C (°F)	12.6 (54.7)	14.6 (58.3)	17.5 (63.5)	21.5 (70.7)	24.8 (76.6)	27.0 (80.6)	28.2 (82.8)	27.8 (82.0)	26.4 (79.5)	22.9 (73.2)	18.6 (65.5)	13.9 (57.0)	21.3 (70.4)
Mean daily minimum °C (°F)	8.6 (47.5)	10.7 (51.3)	13.8 (56.8)	17.7 (63.9)	21.1 (70.0)	23.6 (74.5)	24.3 (75.7)	24.3 (75.7)	22.7 (72.9)	18.7 (65.7)	14.4 (57.9)	9.7 (49.5)	17.5 (63.5)
Record low °C (°F)	−4.2 (24.4)	−0.8 (30.6)	−0.6 (30.9)	7.6 (45.7)	13.4 (56.1)	15.9 (60.6)	20.2 (68.4)	21.1 (70.0)	14.6 (58.3)	6.9 (44.4)	0.8 (33.4)	−4.0 (24.8)	−4.2 (24.4)
Average precipitation mm (inches)	51.2 (2.02)	75.1 (2.96)	125.3 (4.93)	167.5 (6.59)	201.8 (7.94)	242.9 (9.56)	171.2 (6.74)	219.6 (8.65)	126.9 (5.00)	34.5 (1.36)	37.9 (1.49)	43.1 (1.70)	1,497 (58.94)
Average precipitation days (≥ 0.1 mm)	7.6	10.4	14.4	14.8	16.8	19.3	14.7	17.9	11.9	5.5	5.5	6.5	145.3
Average snowy days	0	0	0	0	0	0	0	0	0	0	0	0.1	0.1
Average relative humidity (%)	78	79	80	81	81	83	80	82	81	78	78	78	80
Mean monthly sunshine hours	123.0	98.8	94.4	106.4	126.6	140.9	206.2	182.5	177.3	180.8	156.1	141.6	1,734.6
Percentage possible sunshine	37	31	25	28	31	35	50	46	48	51	48	43	39
Source: China Meteorological Administrationall-time record low

== Attractions ==
- Zhonghandi, Ancestral Residence of Lee Kuan Yew, the first Prime Minister of Singapore, serving from 1959 to 1990.
