= 2011 Singaporean presidential election =

- 27 August 2011
- Registered: 2,274,773 (▲7.63%)
- Turnout: 94.80% (▲0.32pp)
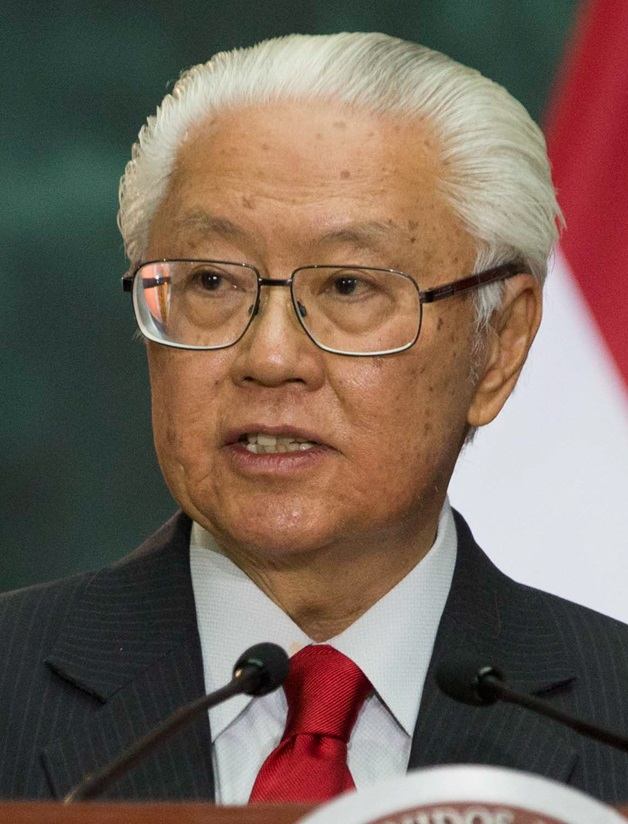

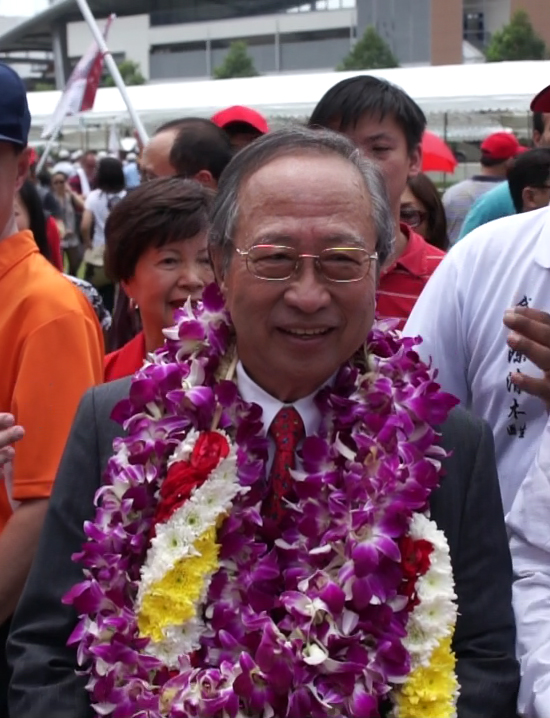

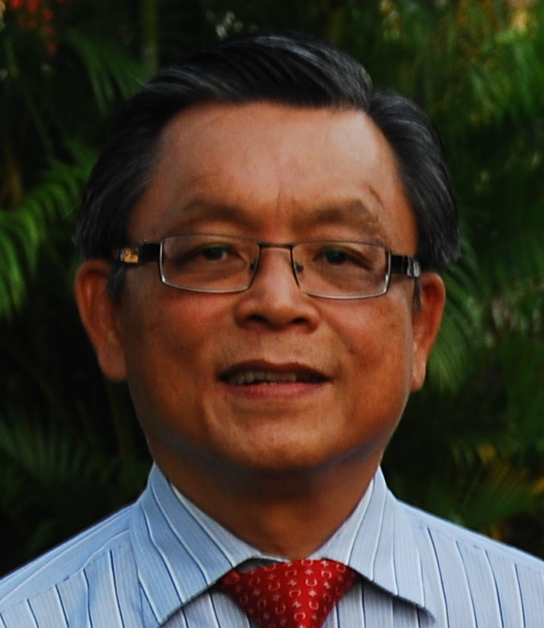

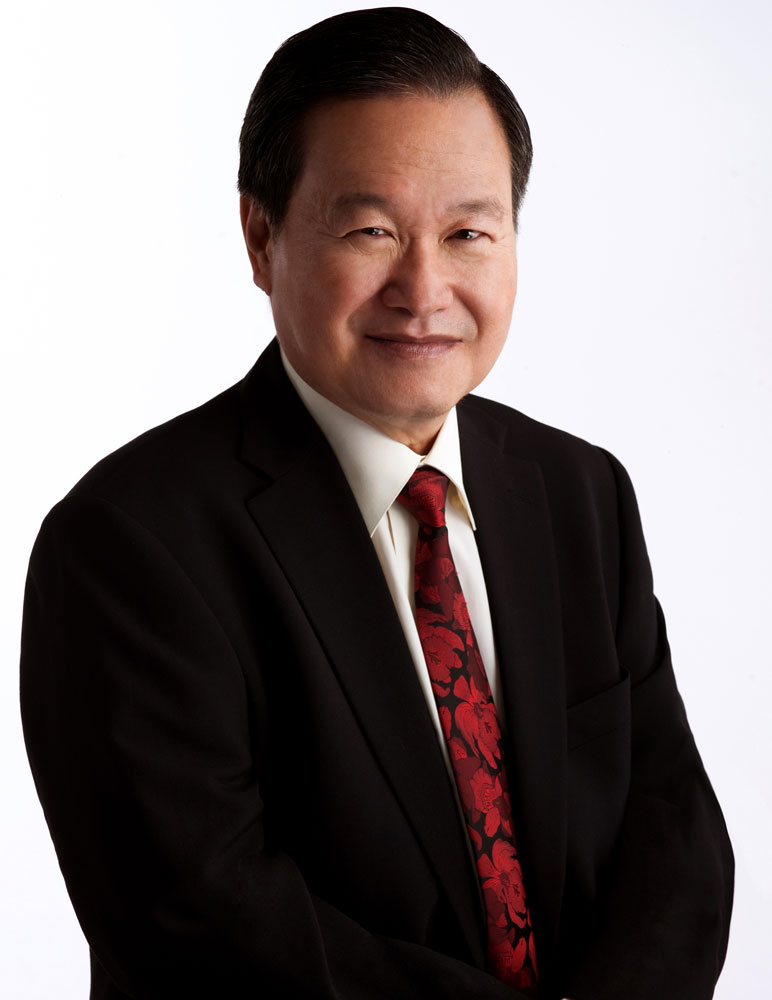
Nominee	Tony Tan	Tan Cheng Bock
Party	Independent	Independent
Popular vote	745,693	738,311
Percentage	35.20%	34.85%
Nominee	Tan Jee Say	Tan Kin Lian
Party	Independent	Independent
Popular vote	530,441	104,095
Percentage	25.04%	4.91%
President before election
S. R. Nathan
Independent
Elected President
Tony Tan
Independent

Presidential elections were held in Singapore on 27 August 2011. It was the fourth direct presidential election and the second to be contested by more than one candidate.

Four candidates contested the non-partisan position: Tony Tan, Tan Cheng Bock, Tan Jee Say and Tan Kin Lian. All were independents or had resigned from any political parties they were previously members of. Each candidate was issued a Certificate of Eligibility (COE) and a community certificate, meeting the eligibility requirements to contest in the election.

Singaporeans were unusually divided in this election. Tony Tan won with 35.20% of the vote, narrowly defeating Tan Cheng Bock, who received 34.85%, by just 7,382 votes, prompting an election recount. The other candidates, Tan Jee Say and Tan Kin Lian, received 25.04% and 4.91%, with Tan Kin Lian losing his election deposit for failing to secure over 12.5%. As no runoff elections apply for less than 50% of the vote, Tan was inaugurated as the seventh President of Singapore on 1 September 2011 with a relative majority result.

== Background ==
The president is the head of state of Singapore. Following the Westminster system, the position is largely ceremonial, but enjoys several reserve powers including withholding presidential assent on supply bills and changing or revoking civil service appointments. The current system of holding elections for the presidency began with the 1993 election. Before then, the president was selected by Parliament.

There are strict requirements for prospective election candidates, and whether a candidate meets the qualifications or not is decided by the Presidential Elections Committee (PEC). In short, candidates must satisfy either the public sector or private sector requirements. The public sector requirement has an automatic track where the candidate has held either a designated public office or chief executive position of a key statutory board or government company. The private sector requirement also has an automatic track where the candidate has held a chairmanship or CEO position of a company with S$100 million paid-up capital. Notwithstanding the automatic tracks of the aforementioned, candidates could also be qualified on a deliberative track where their abilities and experiences have been assessed by the PEC to be equivalent to either of the public or private sector automatic track requirements.

The presidency, by the rules of the Constitution, requires a nonpartisan candidate/officeholder. However, in this election, three of the four candidates had connections to the dominant People's Action Party, and the fourth contested the recent 2011 general election under the banner of the Singapore Democratic Party.

Moreover, since the amendment of the constitution of electing president in 1991, 2011 was the first year in Singapore's history whereas both a parliamentary and presidential election would occur on the same calendar year.

=== Parliamentary reform ===
On 11 March 2010, the Government tabled three bills in the parliament to amend the Constitution, the Presidential Elections Act and the Parliamentary Elections Act. A one-day "cooling-off" day was implemented, during which campaigning was forbidden, with only party political broadcasts allowed. Internet campaigning was also formally legalised as a legitimate means of political campaigning. On 26 April 2010, the amendments to the Constitution were passed by a vote of 74–1 after a three-hour debate on the bill.

Nomination Day for eligible candidates was held on 17 August 2011. Four candidates were issued certificates of eligibility by Singapore's Presidential Elections Committee, and all four were nominated on Nomination Day. At the time of the election, it was the biggest democratic exercise in Singapore, with 2,153,014 local votes and 3,375 overseas votes cast.

== Candidates ==
=== Eligible ===
Candidates	Background	Outcome
Tony Tan	A former PAP member, he was the Chairman of People's Action Party and MP of Sembawang GRC between 1998 and 2006 and the Deputy Prime Minister until 2006. He was both the executive director of the Government of Singapore Investment Corporation (GIC) and Chairman of Singapore Press Holdings (SPH), announced his candidacy on 23 June 2011, after speculations that he would run. Tan would resign from all his position in 2010 and also announced that he would resign from his posts at the GIC and SPH to alleviate concerns over conflict of interest. He submitted his presidential eligibility forms on 7 July.	Application for the Certificate of Eligibility Accepted.
Tan Cheng Bock	A former People's Action Party (PAP) member who was a Member of Parliament (MP) representing Ayer Rajah SMC from 1980 to 2006 (now under West Coast GRC), he left politics in 2006 and announced his candidacy on 27 May 2011. He submitted his presidential eligibility forms on 22 July.	Application for the Certificate of Eligibility Accepted.
Tan Jee Say	A former civil servant and Singapore Democratic Party (SDP) member (who contested Holland–Bukit Timah GRC in the recent election), announced his candidacy on 15 July. He said that he did so as "many Singaporeans want a non-PAP President whose independence of the PAP is clear, obvious and cannot be in doubt." He submitted his presidential eligibility forms on 3 August.	Application for the Certificate of Eligibility Accepted.
Tan Kin Lian	Former NTUC Income Chief Executive Officer and former PAP Branch Secretary for Marine Parade, said on 3 June 2011 that he may stand for president, he left politics in 2008 and later announced his candidacy on 7 June 2011. He submitted his presidential eligibility forms on 7 July.	Application for the Certificate of Eligibility Accepted.

=== Declared Ineligible ===
Candidates	Background	Outcome
Andrew Kuan	A former JTC Corporation group Chief Financial Officer (CFO), who attempted to run for the presidency in 2005 before being controversially disqualified, stated that he will collect eligibility forms 'some time in July'. He picked up the forms on 27 July, and submitted his forms on 5 August. He was found to be ineligible due to the same reason for the previous election, in that his position as CFO of JTC Corporation was not comparable to those of a chief executive officer (CEO).	Application for the Certificate of Eligibility rejected.
Ooi Boon Ewe	Former leader of the People's Liberal Democratic Party and perennial seeker of the presidency in the last two elections, announced his bid for the presidency on 1 June 2011. He submitted his forms on 11 July, and was found to be ineligible because his application was incomplete and he had asked for a waiver from certain requirements set forth by the Constitution, which the Elections Department claims it has no power to do.	Application for the Certificate of Eligibility rejected.

=== Declined to be candidates ===
Candidates	Background
S. R. Nathan	The incumbent and sixth president of Singapore, was reportedly considering re-election but announced on 2 July 2011 that he would not run for re-election.
S. Jayakumar	Senior Minister, initially considered a run, but he stated that he would not be running in an interview.
Chiam See Tong	Singapore People's Party (SPP) leader and former Member of Parliament (MP) for Potong Pasir Single Member Constituency was speculated to run for the presidency but later announced that he would not run for the presidency on 10 June.
George Yeo	Minister for Foreign Affairs from 2004 to 2011 and MP for Aljunied Group Representation Constituency (GRC) from 1988 to 2011, initially ruled out a run for president. On 5 June, Yeo announced that he will make a decision on running for president within 2 weeks, and has asked his friends to pick up eligibility forms on his behalf. Yeo later declined running for the presidency on 15 June via his Facebook page.
Zainul Abidin bin Mohamed Rasheed	An MP for Aljunied Group Representation Constituency (GRC) until 2011 declined to announce a candidacy on 29 May, but did not categorically rule out a run, declaring that he wished to take a break before making any decisions. He did not make any further statements on a possible campaign afterwards.
Mark Lee Kheng Siang	He announced his bid for the presidency on 1 June, but did not submit after discovering that he did not meet the requirements of being a private company CEO for 3 years. Lee had resigned as CEO of Global Ariel 5 months shy of the 3-year mark in July 2007.
Mohamed Raffi Bashir Ahmed	A former food stall owner collected eligibility forms at the Election Department headquarters on 9 June. Ahmed was still under investigation for driving a van spray-painted with expletives into the Islamic Religious Council of Singapore premises earlier in January.

== Endorsements ==
In alphabetical order:

=== Tan Cheng Bock ===
Tan Cheng Bock received a formal endorsement from the Singapore Baseball and Softball Association.

=== Tan Jee Say ===
Tan Jee Say was endorsed by Nicole Seah from the National Solidarity Party (NSP), as well as Vincent Wijeysingha, Jeannette Chong-Aruldoss, Steve Chia, and candidate-hopeful Andrew Kuan (who was not awarded a COE). He also received an endorsement from the political website Temasek Review Emeritus.

=== Tony Tan ===
As of 20 August 2011, Tony Tan was endorsed by:

- 21 unions (including the Transport and Logistics cluster, the Marine and Machinery Engineering cluster, and the Infocomm and Media cluster) which collectively represent about 112,000 workers
- Singapore Chinese Chamber of Commerce and Industry (SCCCI)
- Singapore Malay Chamber of Commerce and Industry (SMCCI)
- Singapore Indian Chamber of Commerce and Industry (SICCI)
- Federation of Tan Clan Associations with 10,000 members
- Singapore Federation of Chinese Clan Associations (SFCCA)
- Nine Teochew clan associations

=== Tan Kin Lian ===
Tan Kin Lian did not receive any group endorsements. He said during a walkabout in Tiong Bahru, "I met so many people here today. They tell me they want to support me, they tell me 'Mr Tan, please don't drop out, give us a chance to vote'. So I want to be endorsed by the people."

== Timeline ==
All the dates and time reflected in this timeline are in Local Singaporean Time (SST).

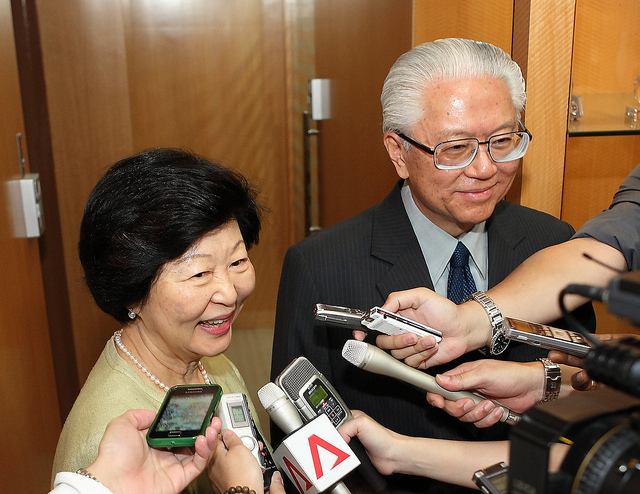
Tony Tan and his wife at the press conference announcing his candidacy, June 2011.

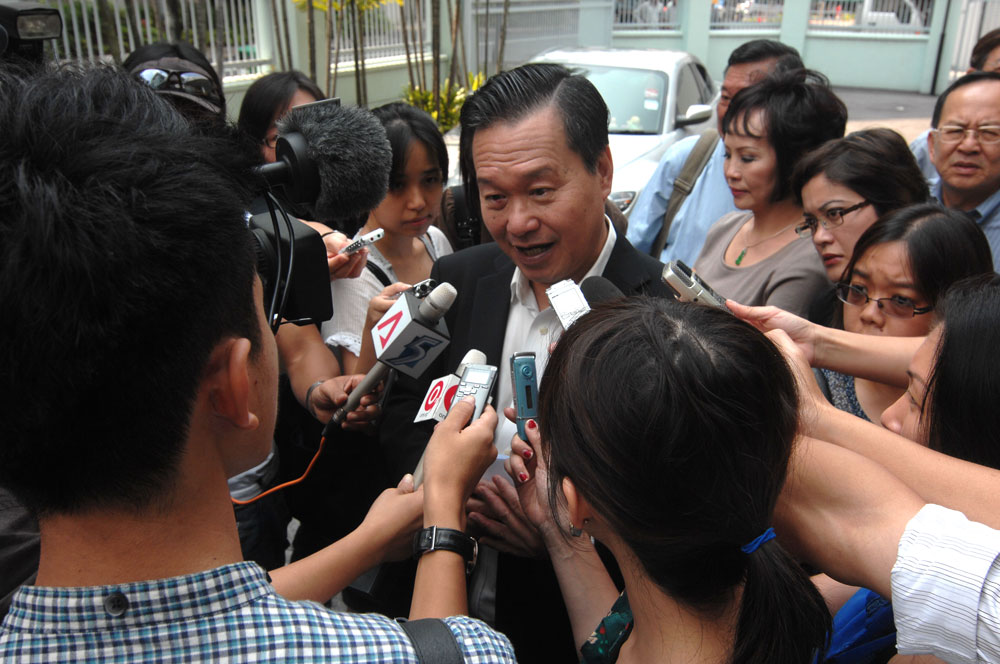
Tan Kin Lian speaking to the media after submitting election forms

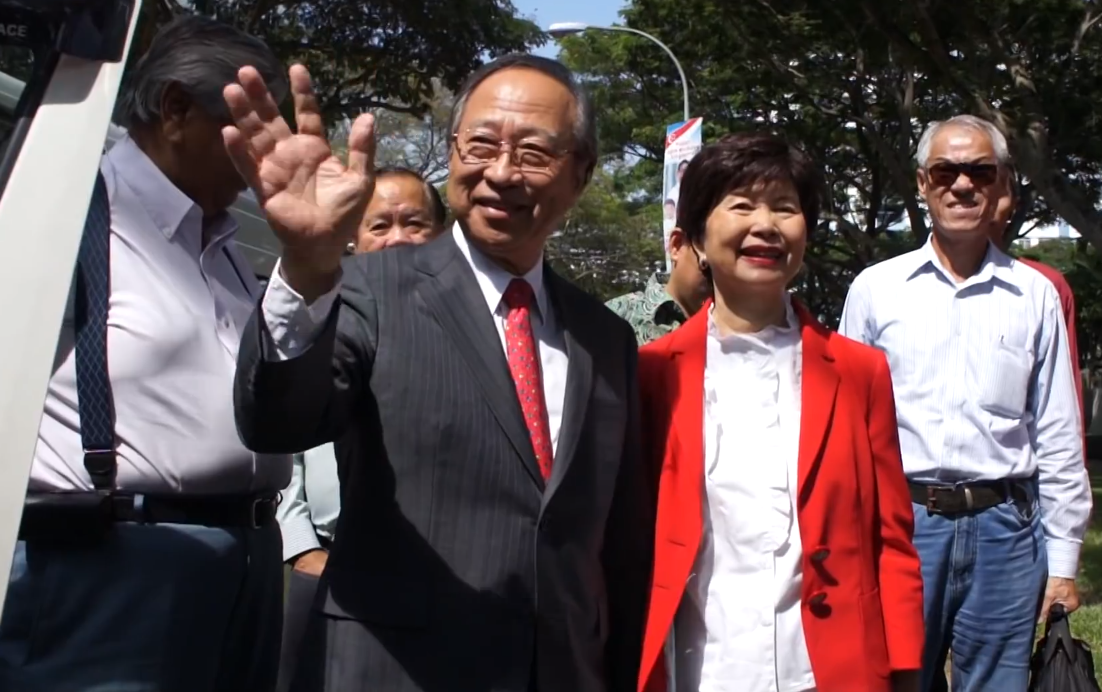
Tan Cheng Bock waving to reporters at the nomination centre.

Date	Event
May 2011
10 May	Former Foreign Minister George Yeo declines to run for the presidency, or any other forms of elected office, following his defeat in the recent general election on 8 May, calling himself a "free spirit" and not "temperamentally suited" for the presidency.
27 May	Former Member of Parliament Tan Cheng Bock announces candidacy.
29 May	Former Senior Minister of State Zainul Abidin declines to run for the presidency, but left open the option of declaring a run in the future. He did not make any announcement on a run for the presidency afterwards.
June 2011
1 June	Applications for Certificate of Eligibility (COE) to run in the race were made available. Both Mark Lee and People's Liberal Democratic Party leader Ooi Boon Ewe announces their candidacy, the latter asking the Election Department to waive one of the constitutional requirements for the presidency for him.
2 June	George Yeo backtracks from earlier statement, announces on Facebook that he is "thinking hard" about a run.
3 June	Former Director and CEO of NTUC Income and Party Secretary Tan Kin Lian said he will announce his candidacy at a "later date", and confirmed that he will stand in the elections four days later. Mark Lee was revealed ineligible to stand in the elections.
5 June	George Yeo announces he will make a decision on a potential candidacy in 2 weeks, and asked friends to pick up the eligibility forms on his behalf. He later confirmed that he declines to run for president on 15 June.
9 June	Former Senior Minister S. Jayakumar declines to run for president during a newspaper interview. Meanwhile, Mohamed Raffi Bashir Ahmed and Andrew Kuan collected eligibility forms for the presidency.
10 June	Secretary-General of Singapore People's Party and former Opposition Member of Parliament Chiam See Tong declines to run for president.
23 June	Former Deputy Prime Minister, executive director of the Government of Singapore Investment Corporation (GIC) and Chairman of Singapore Press Holdings Limited (SPH), Tony Tan, announces candidacy.
26 June	Tan Kin Lian told Shin Min Daily News that he does not rule out the possibility of discussing with Tan Cheng Bock, of one of them dropping out of the campaign to prevent a three-cornered contest.
28 June	Tan Cheng Bock responded that he would not drop the presidential bid even if Tan Kin Lian approaches him about it.
July 2011
1 July	Incumbent President S.R. Nathan declines to run for a third term in the presidential office.
7 July	Tony Tan and Tan Kin Lian submit eligibility forms.
11 July	Ooi Boon Ewe submits eligibility forms.
15 July	Singapore Democratic Party candidate Tan Jee Say announces candidacy.
22 July	Tan Cheng Bock submits eligibility forms.
27 July	Andrew Kuan collected eligibility forms.
August 2011
3 August	Issuance of Writ of Election, with the nomination day and polling day adjourned at 17 and 27 August, respectively. Tan Jee Say submits eligibility forms.
5 August	Andrew Kuan submits eligibility forms.
6 August	Deadline for application of certificates of eligibility
11 August	Presidential Elections Commission announced four candidates: Tan Cheng Bock, Tan Jee Say, Tony Tan and Tan Kin Lian to be granted certificates of eligibility. All four candidates had satisfied the Article 19(2)(e) of the Constitution, while Tan Jee Say and Tan Kin Lian also satisfied the Article 19(2)(g)(iv) of the Constitution.
17 August	Nomination Day; All four candidates were successfully nominated and their respective election symbols and slogans were unveiled.
17–25 August	Campaigning Period (see below)
18 August	First Candidate Broadcast
20 August	Broadcast of Candidate Profiles
23 August	Channel NewsAsia hosts televised forum "Meet the Candidates"; Tan Jee Say holds night rally at Toa Payoh Stadium.
24 August	Tony Tan holds lunchtime rally at Boat Quay, next to the United Overseas Bank (UOB) Plaza. Tan Kin Lian holds night rally at Yio Chu Kang Stadium.
25 August	Tan Cheng Bock holds night indoor rally at the Singapore Expo.
26 August	Cooling-off Day; Second Candidate Broadcast
27 August	Polling Day (see below)
28 August	1.19 am- Election recount begins 4.23 am- Returning Officer Yam Ah Mee announces outcome of election (see below)
31 August	S.R. Nathan's term of office expires. Overseas Vote Counting (see below)
September 2011
1 September	7.30 pm- Presidential inauguration at Istana (see below)

=== Candidate participation timeline ===
Candidate announcement and, if applicable, withdrawal dates are as follows:

Status
Successfully nominated
Currently running
Expressed interest, yet to run
Withdrawn/Did not qualify
Events
Writ of Election issued
Deadline for Certificate of Eligibility
Nomination Day
Polling Day
Inauguration Day

== Analysis ==
Various analysts said that while George Yeo is still a PAP member (the Constitution prohibits the president from having party membership), his popularity seems to have survived his defeat at Aljunied GRC. Some analysts noted that should Yeo decide to run, he should be well-suited for the presidency, noting that he has served in various cabinet positions. Others were critical of the speed with which Yeo announced his intention not to contest in future his lost parliamentary seat, his comments about being "temperamentally" unsuited to the presidency, and the likely difficulty of him claiming any independence from the PAP in a contested election.

After Yeo declined to run for the presidency, political analysts said Tony Tan would be one of the more suitable candidates, even though Tan himself had yet to declare his candidacy at that time.

== Reaction ==
Since late June, Minister for Law K. Shanmugam expressed concerns that voters and prospective candidates were confusing or misinterpreting the president's powers, and clarified what the office could and could not do. In August, he said at a forum, "The president can speak on issues only as authorised by the Cabinet” and that “[he] must follow the advice of the Cabinet in the discharge of his duties." He also said, "If [the president] is someone who commands little or no respect of the prime minister, then of course influence will be limited." The then six presidential hopefuls commented on his remarks on the presidential role.

In an e-mail to reporters from the Chinese-language newspaper Lianhe Zaobao in early July, Prime Minister Lee Hsien Loong praised Tony Tan's performance during his time in Cabinet, and stopping short of an outright endorsement, said that should Tony Tan be elected president, he would be able to unite Singaporeans, and bring honour to the country.

In early August, Minister of National Development Khaw Boon Wan echoed Lee Hsien Loong's sentiments on Tony Tan at a National Day banquet in Sembawang, stating that he will be an excellent president, and make the nation proud. In what could be construed as an endorsement, Khaw publicly wished Tony Tan will win the presidency.

In a break with the past, National Trades Union Congress (NTUC) President and Member of Parliament Lim Swee Say said the NTUC will not force all its constituent trades union to endorse one candidate, and that the constituent trades union may endorse any candidate as they desire.

== Nomination Day and Campaigning ==
The earliest instance of its widespread campaigning first surfaced on 17 June when Tan Cheng Bock visited across various bazaars to engage with voters, according to Shin Min Daily News., then with young voters at a local youth park on 1 August, and across at least 10 neighbourhoods as of 7 August. Elsewhere, other candidates had also engaged through voters across Singapore, including Tan Kin Lian, who reportedly travelled to Batam to meet with Singaporeans.

On 8 July, Prime Minister Lee Hsien Loong issued a statement on presidential campaigns. Campaigning will mostly be television-based due to its reach, and each candidate had to participate in two presidential candidate broadcasts (PCB), both being 10-minute blocks of free airtime which aired on 18 and 26 August. Moreover, Mediacorp would produce a series of programme on the candidates on 20 August, and its televised "Meet the Candidates" forum on the 23rd.

Under the constitution, each presidential candidate's spending limit is S$0.30 per voter or S$600,000, whichever is greater. The penalty for overspending is a S$2,000 fine and a three-year disqualification for running in elections. The amount was revealed to be S$682,431; Cheng Bock spent the most at $585,045, followed by Tony's $503,070, Jee Say's $162,337, and Kin Lian's $70,912.

The deadline for the applications for Certificate of Eligibility happened on 6 August, and four candidates had been granted those certificates on 11 August. They were then successfully nominated on 17 August and unveiled their respective slogans and symbols were revealed, as follows:

Candidate	Symbol	Description	Campaign Slogan
Tan Cheng Bock		A palm tree, based on an Arecaceae.	Think Singaporeans First
Tan Jee Say		A white heart-shaped icon.	Heart of the Nation
Tony Tan		A pair of glasses.	Confidence for the Future
Tan Kin Lian		A red chatbox with a white hand.	Voice of the People

With four candidates contesting this Presidential election, this marked the first instance for a four-way contest in any kind of Singapore elections in 14 years since the 1997 election.

== Voting ==
The Writ of Election was issued on 3 August, adjourning the polling day to be on 27 August. Not counting by-elections, this was the second national election to occur within the same calendar year and had the narrowest gap in-between the last national election, with the parliamentary election occurred three months prior.

Elections Department announced some new implementations for this election, where voters could print out their polling cards from their website if they do not receive them in the mail. Nomination Day also added a recommendation to provide a recent passport photo with a size of no more than 2 MB and 400 x 514 pixels, which they will be printed onto the ballot papers for better identification.

In the preceding general election, about 290,500 voters (out of 2,350,873) have their names expunged from the voting list due to abstention, where voting is mandatory under the constitution. At the time of the announcement, its electorate has been lowered by 76,100 voters down to 2,274,773, and that around 71,000 voters had since reinstated from the list before the Writ of Election was issued, as restoration of names from the voters list are suspended upon the issuance of the writ.

== Results ==
At about 10.30 pm, around two and a half hours after polls closed, Tan Kin Lian conceded, and reiterating that he was disappointed about the results after visiting various counting stations and added he might forfeit his S$48,000 election deposit but expressed that he gained the experience of its contest and believed he could do even better. He hinted that the election "will be a tough fight between the top two candidates", but declined naming who were the top two.

At 1.19 am on 28 August, ELD announced on a statement that they had begun an election recount as the Returning Officer Yam Ah Mee conclude that the top two candidates, Tony Tan and Tan Cheng Bock, had a margin of less than 2% during their initial counting.

The recount went for around three hours before results were declared at about 4.23 am SST, where Tony Tan was declared president-elect with 35.19% of the votes, leading by a 0.34% margin ahead of Tan Cheng Bock, or 7,269 votes. Tan Kin Lian, who polled under 5% of the 2,115,188 valid votes cast, had his election deposit of S$48,000 forfeited.

Including overseas votes that were collected on 31 August, the final vote tally were as follows:

Candidate	Votes	%
Tony Tan	745,693	35.20
Tan Cheng Bock	738,311	34.85
Tan Jee Say	530,441	25.04
Tan Kin Lian	104,095	4.91
Total	2,118,540	100.00
Valid votes	2,118,540	98.24
Invalid/blank votes	37,849	1.76
Total votes	2,156,389	100.00
Registered voters/turnout	2,274,773	94.80
Source: Elections Department

== Post-election events ==
=== Reactions of candidates ===
Subsequently, Tony Tan made his thank you speech at Toa Payoh Stadium, and pledged to work for all Singaporeans. He also thanked the other three candidates who "have campaigned with vigour, giving Singaporeans a choice". At a subsequent press conference that afternoon, Tony Tan emphasised that the president works for all Singaporeans and he will not be an "ivory tower President", just as President S.R. Nathan was not. When asked his thoughts about the tight race and his winning margin of just 0.34 percentage points over his closest rival Tan Cheng Bock, Tony Tan said his results were "decisive" in Singapore's first past-the-post system.

Subsequently, Tan Cheng Bock held a press conference in the afternoon as well. Speaking to the media at his first news conference following the presidential election results, Tan Cheng Bock said he wanted to continue unifying Singaporeans. He planned to continue engaging Singaporeans through social media such as his Facebook page and blog by making comments and suggestions. He said this was where the majority of youth lie and he believes they need to be better informed. Tan Cheng Bock announced his intention to return to his medical practice and did not rule out the possibility of running again for the next presidential election in 2017.

As for the third placed candidate Tan Jee Say, he released a statement in the afternoon of 28 August and said he looked forward to Tony Tan performing the duties and responsibilities of the office of president in a fair and honourable manner. He also congratulated Tan Cheng Bock and Tan Kin Lian "for their earnest campaign". Earlier in the morning after the results were announced, Tan Jee Say said although he had lost the election, it was still a "victory of hearts" in a press conference because by standing up to be counted, a voice was given to Singaporeans that will continue to be heard. When asked whether he would rejoin the Singapore Democratic Party, he said he had not made up his mind to do so.

=== Reaction of the Prime Minister ===
Prime Minister Lee Hsien Loong, in a statement released from his office soon after the declaration of results, said the election has been an intensely fought election, and the result was very close. Lee said both Tony Tan and Tan Cheng Bock (who had the next highest number of votes) conveyed strong unifying messages and declared their intention to work closely with the government. Both had long records of public service but was "reassuring that Singaporean voters recognised and valued their strengths, as well as their inclusive approach". He called Tony Tan to congratulate him on his election and assure him of "his government's full cooperation" and also called Tan Cheng Bock to thank him and his supporters for "having fought an effective and dignified campaign".

=== Calls for voting reform ===
The Reform Party, an opposition political party, released a statement on its website on 28 August. While congratulating Tony Tan on his election, it stated that a two-round system should be implemented in place of first-past-the-post voting. It proposed that a runoff election should be held a week later after the first round in future elections. In addition, the statement added: "the President should unite Singaporeans of all political persuasions and views. To do this he needs to be elected by a clear majority of votes cast and not just on an almost statistically insignificant difference between him and the runner-up."

=== Counting of overseas votes ===
On 31 August, the 5,504 overseas votes were counted. Out of the 3,375 votes cast, a combined 3,352 votes were valid. Tony Tan, Tan Cheng Bock, Tan Jee Say and Tan Kin Lian each receiving 1,296, 1,183, 709, and 164 votes, respectively (the voting percentages for the overseas votes were 38.66%, 35.29%, 21.15% and 4.89%, respectively). The overall percentage of the vote share inclusive of overseas votes were virtually unchanged.

Returning Officer Yam Ah Mee thanked the more than 20,000 election officials who participated in the exercise from Nomination Day to the Polling Day to the counting process; in addition the efficiency of the officials allowed over two million local votes to be counted. Both Tony Tan and Tan Cheng Bock, and a representative for Tan Jee Say, Jeannette Chong-Aruldoss, turned up at the People's Association Headquarters on the afternoon to witness the counting.

Tony Tan thanked all the overseas voters who turned up to cast their vote while Tan Cheng Bock expressed that he was pleasantly surprised at the result as he expected Tony Tan to garner a higher percentage of overseas votes.

=== Presidential inauguration ===
At 7.30pm SST of 1 September, outgoing president S.R. Nathan received his final presidential salute from members of the Singapore Armed Forces at the Istana, before he left office with his wife Urmila Nandey to retire to his home in East Coast. Later, Tony Tan arrived with his wife Mary Chee and at 8.00pm SST, Tan was sworn in as president at the Istana, in the presence of the diplomatic corps, the Cabinet, selected guests and Members of Parliament. Tan said in his speech: "I will wield this 'second key' with utmost care. Our reserves have been painstakingly built up over decades, and should not be compromised. Our government must continue to live within its means, and only draw on past reserves in an exceptional crisis - like the one we faced in 2008. I therefore welcome the Prime Minister's assurance that the government will continue to be responsible with our finances. I will play my role to safeguard our reserves, so that they can continue to give us confidence in tough times." This was in reference to the custodial powers of the Singapore presidency, in which the president acts as a fiscal guardian to the national reserves. Tan added he can be both a resource and a symbol and would offer the Prime Minister his confidential advice on government policies and engage all Singaporeans to understand their interests and concerns.

=== Margin of victory ===
According to Singapore Elections, an archive of Singapore election results, a post made on its Facebook page stated that the presidential election of 2011 "has established a new record of the second-narrowest percentage margin in history, after River Valley in the 1959 elections (margin of around 0.05%) and beating Sepoy Lines in the 1957 city elections (margin of around 0.4%)". In comparison, the margin of victory for Tony Tan was only 0.35% over his closest rival Tan Cheng Bock.
