= Returning officer =

Type of election officer

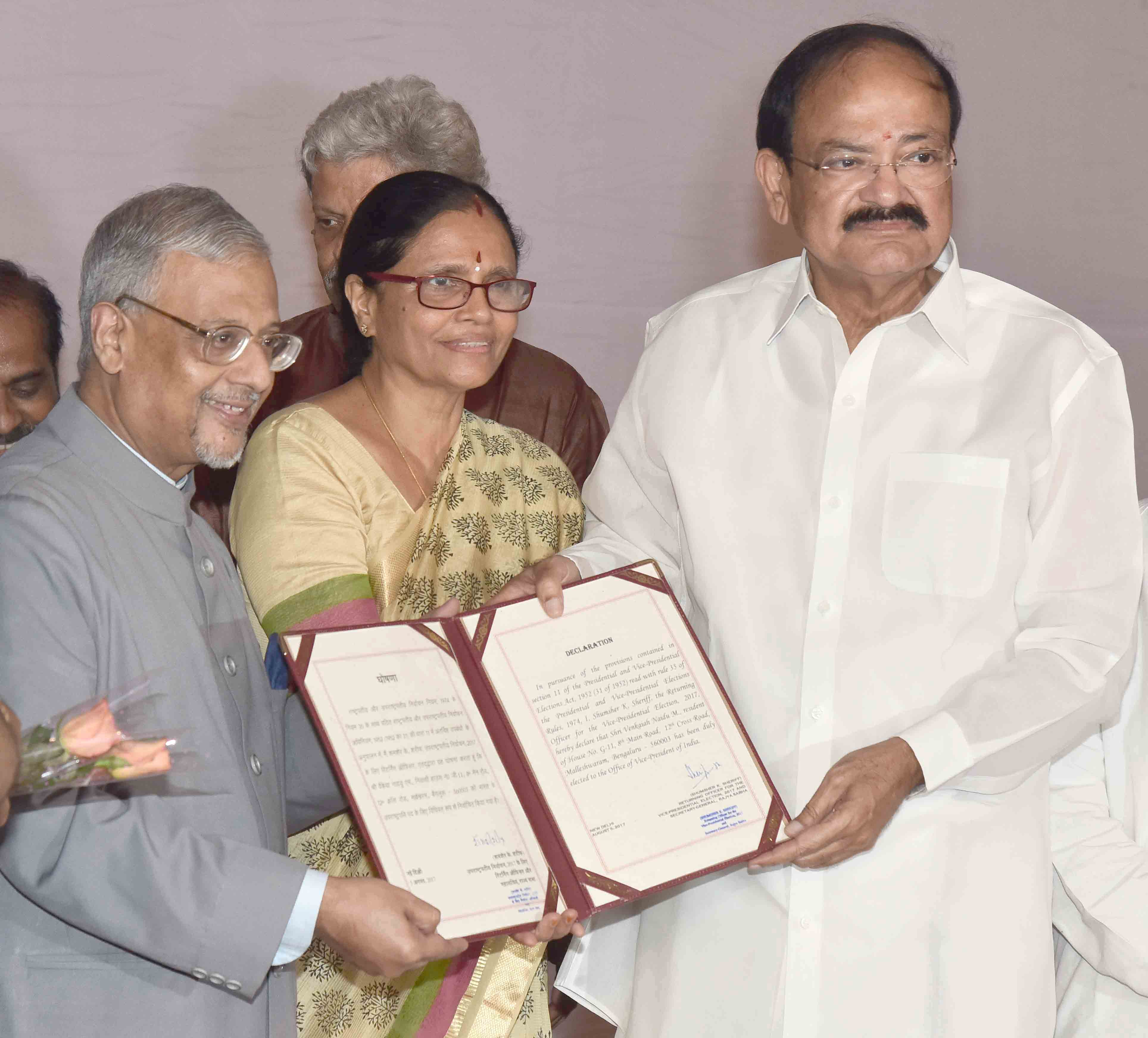
The returning officer (centre) for the 2017 Indian vice presidential election holds the declaration of the result with the two candidates

In various parliamentary systems, a returning officer is responsible for overseeing elections in one or more constituencies.

== Australia ==
In Australia a returning officer is an employee of the Australian Electoral Commission or a state electoral commission who heads the local divisional office full-time, and oversees elections in their division, or an employee of a private firm which carries out elections and/or ballots in the private and/or public sectors, or anyone who carries out any election and/or ballot for any group or groups.

== Canada ==
In Canada, at the federal level, the returning officer of an electoral district is appointed for a ten-year term by the Chief Electoral Officer. The returning officer is responsible for handling the electoral process in the riding, and updating the National Register of Electors with current information about voters in the electoral district to which they are appointed. Before enactment of the Canada Elections Act in 2000, in the case of a tie between the two leading candidates in an election, the returning officer would cast the deciding vote. Since 2000, a tie between two leading candidates automatically results in a by-election.

The provinces and territories of Canada each have their own returning officers.

== Germany ==
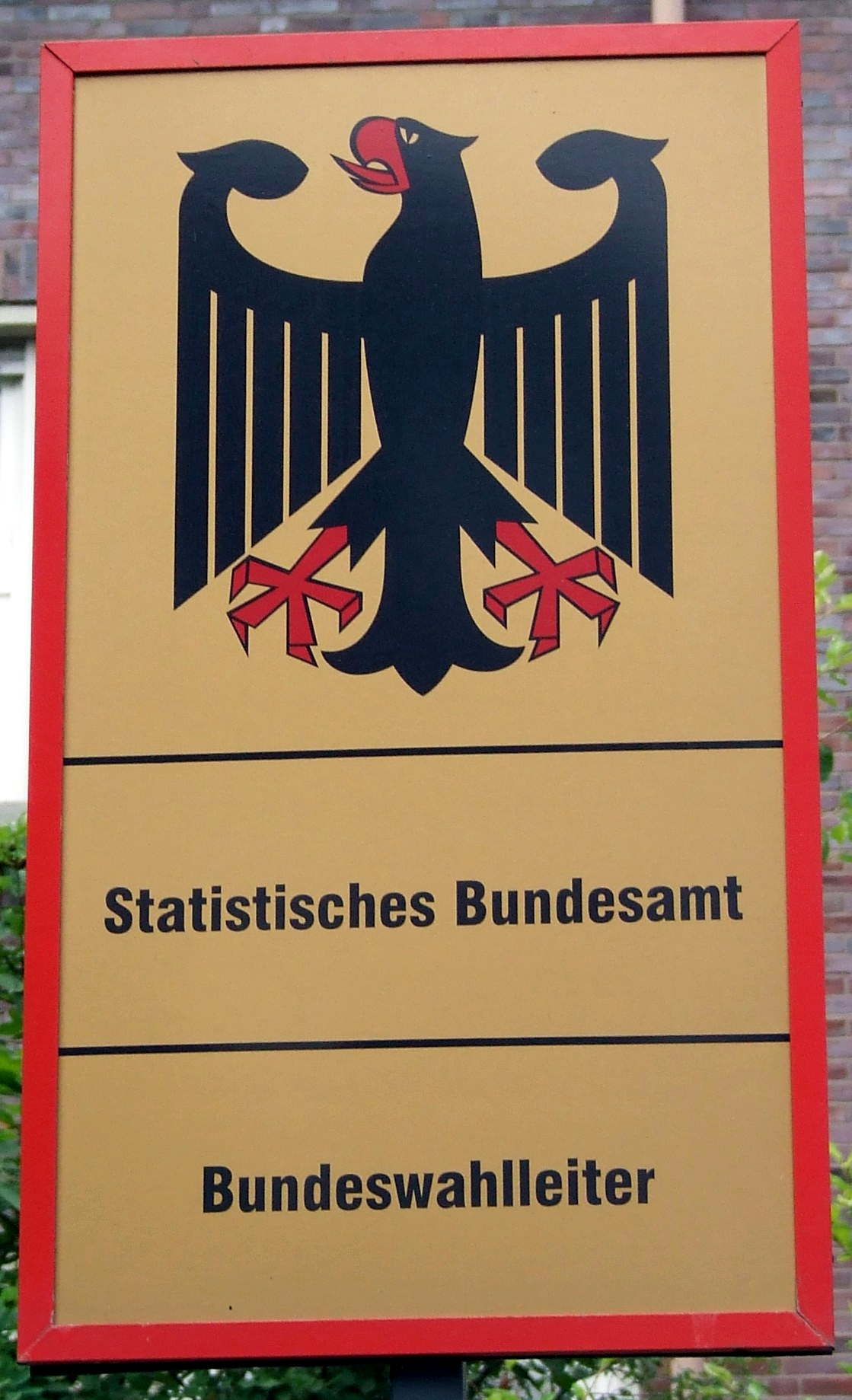
Sign used by the federal returning officer of Germany

Germany has a federal returning officer, responsible for overseeing elections on a federal level, and a returning officer in each state.

== Hong Kong ==
In Hong Kong, the returning officer is usually an administrative officer of the government.

== India ==
The returning officer of a parliamentary or assembly constituency is responsible for the conduct of elections in the parliamentary or assembly constituency concerned as per the Representation of the People Act, 1951. Returning officer is the head of elections in a particular constituency. Generally, in the case of Lok Sabha elections, it is the Collector/District Magistrate and in the case of state assembly elections, it is the Sub-Divisional Magistrate who is ex-officio returning officer. Returning officer is the statutory authority to conduct the polling, counting process and to decide validity of ballot paper and election commission has no power to overrule him or her.

The Election Commission of India nominates or designates an officer of the government or a local authority as the returning officer for each of the assembly and parliamentary constituencies in consultation with the state government/union territory administration. In addition, the Election Commission of India also appoints one or more assistant returning officers for each of the assembly and parliamentary constituencies to assist the returning officer in the performance of his functions in connection with the conduct of elections.

== Ireland ==
In the Republic of Ireland, the post of returning officer in Dublin and Cork is held by the city sheriff, and in the other areas by the county registrar of the area (a senior court official). For local elections, the position is held by the administrative head of the local council. The returning officer for presidential elections and referendums is a senior official in the franchise section of the Department of the Environment.

== New Zealand ==
In New Zealand, the returning officer is in charge of overseeing the voting process in each electorate.

== South Korea ==
In Korea, the returning officer is hired by the National Election Commission and Provincial Electoral Commissions. The returning officers supervise the electoral process in specific constituencies with the civil officers from Provincial Governments who works at eup/myeon/dong community service centres and Municipal Governmental Civil Officers.

As Civil officers at community service centres collect the Register of Electors, distribute the posts and phamplets of candidates, Civil Officers from National Election Commission and Provincial Electoral Commissions supervise the Polling stations.

== Singapore ==
The Returning Officer (RO) is in charge of overseeing the conduct of parliamentary (by-elections and general elections) and presidential elections, which is determined by the Prime Minister of Singapore under section 3 of the Parliamentary Elections Act. The RO is also responsible for assigning Assistant Returning Officers (ARO) to assist and delegate all duties related to an electoral event, to receive the required documentation to stand for candidacy, to issue the declaration of nominations during nomination day and adjourning any notice of contested polls, the final result and declaration of the names of elected candidates during polling day or walkovers during nomination day, the names of best-performing losing candidates as non-constituency Members of Parliament (NCMPs) post-elections in the government gazette, any results for sample counts and whether if election recount is necessary, and whether if the votes cast locally are conclusive or requires overseas votes if the margin is lower than overseas votes.

Prior to the 2015 general election, the RO would announce the rejected votes first followed by the total turnout for the constituency. The RO then mention the lines directing to the elections act (of either "Section 49, Subsection 7E, Paragraph A of the Parliamentary Elections Act" (parliamentary election) or "Section 32, Subsection 8D, Paragraph A of the Presidential Elections Act" (presidential elections)) afterwards. Since the 2015 elections, the RO would announce the total valid votes cast first before rejected votes and the lines mentioning about the elections act was omitted, which was probably done due to time constraints as results are announced in series and the introduction of sample counts.

=== List of returning officers ===
Name	Position	Took office	Left office	Elections served
A. A. Willians				GE1955
M Ponnuduray				GE1959, GE1963
Julian Benedict de Souza				GE1968, GE1972
P. Arumalnatham				GE1976
Ong Kok Min				GE1980, BE1981, GE1984, GE1988, PE1993
Lim Siam Kim	Chief executive director, National Heritage Board			GE1991, BE1992
Tan Boon Huat	Chief executive director, People's Association		31 May 2010	GE1997, PE1999, GE2001, PE2005, GE2006
Yam Ah Mee	Chief executive director, People's Association	1 June 2010	31 March 2013	GE2011, PE2011, BE2012, BE2013
Ng Wai Choong	Chief executive director, Energy Market Authority	1 April 2013	31 January 2018	GE2015, BE2016, PE2017
Tan Meng Dui	Chief Executive Officer, National Environment Agency	1 February 2018	31 March 2024	GE2020, PE2023
Han Kok Juan	Director-general, Civil Aviation Authority of Singapore	1 April 2024	present	GE2025

== Sri Lanka ==
In Sri Lanka, returning officers are appointed by the Commissioner of Elections under the Registration of Electors Act, No. 44 of 1980 for all presidential, general (parliamentary), provincial and local government elections held in the island. Normally public officers are appointed as returning officers and they may appoint assistant returning officers to assist them.

In the Parliament of Sri Lanka, the Secretary-General acts as the returning officer for votes conducted within the Parliament.

== United Kingdom ==
=== General elections ===
In England and Wales the post of returning officer for general elections is an honorary one, held by the high sheriff of the county for a county constituency or the mayor or chairman of the local council for a borough constituency. If a constituency overlaps district and county borders, the returning officer is designated by the Secretary of State for Justice.

In practice, the task of conducting the election is delegated to an acting returning officer, who is usually a senior officer in the local authority (the only duties which can be reserved and undertaken by the returning officer are related to the receipt of the writ and the declaration of the result, and only if written notice is given by the returning officer to the acting returning officer). In an English or Welsh constituency where the returning officer is the chairman of the local district council or the mayor if a borough council, the electoral registration officer is automatically the acting returning officer. In an English or Welsh constituency where the high sheriff or mayor is returning officer, the acting returning officer is designated by the Secretary of State for Justice.

In Scotland, there is no office of acting returning officer and the position of returning officer is not an honorary one. The returning officer for general elections is the same person who has been appointed returning officer for the election of councillors in the local authority in which the constituency is situated. If a constituency covers more than one local authority area, the Secretary of State for Justice designates which local authority returning officer will discharge the function.

In Northern Ireland, the Chief Electoral Officer acts as the returning officer.

Returning officers normally announce the results after the count in the following manner:

I, name, the (acting) returning officer for the name of seat, hereby give notice that the total number of votes given for each candidate at the election of date was as follows, list of candidates and the number of votes received. And that name of winning candidate(s) has been duly elected to name of democratic body for name of seat (or name of office).

=== Recall petitions ===
The returning officer for a constituency additionally acts as the petitions officer for recall petitions.

=== Local elections ===
In England and Wales, every district council or unitary authority is required to appoint an officer of the council to be the returning officer for the election of councillors to their local authority, and any parish councils in their area. County councils must also appoint a returning officer for the election of councillors within the county.

== See also ==
- Election official
- Chief Electoral Officer (Canada)
- Chief Electoral Officer of Quebec
- Secretary of state (U.S. state government)
