= President of Singapore =

Head of state

President of the Republic of Singapore
- Presidential coat of arms

- Presidential standard

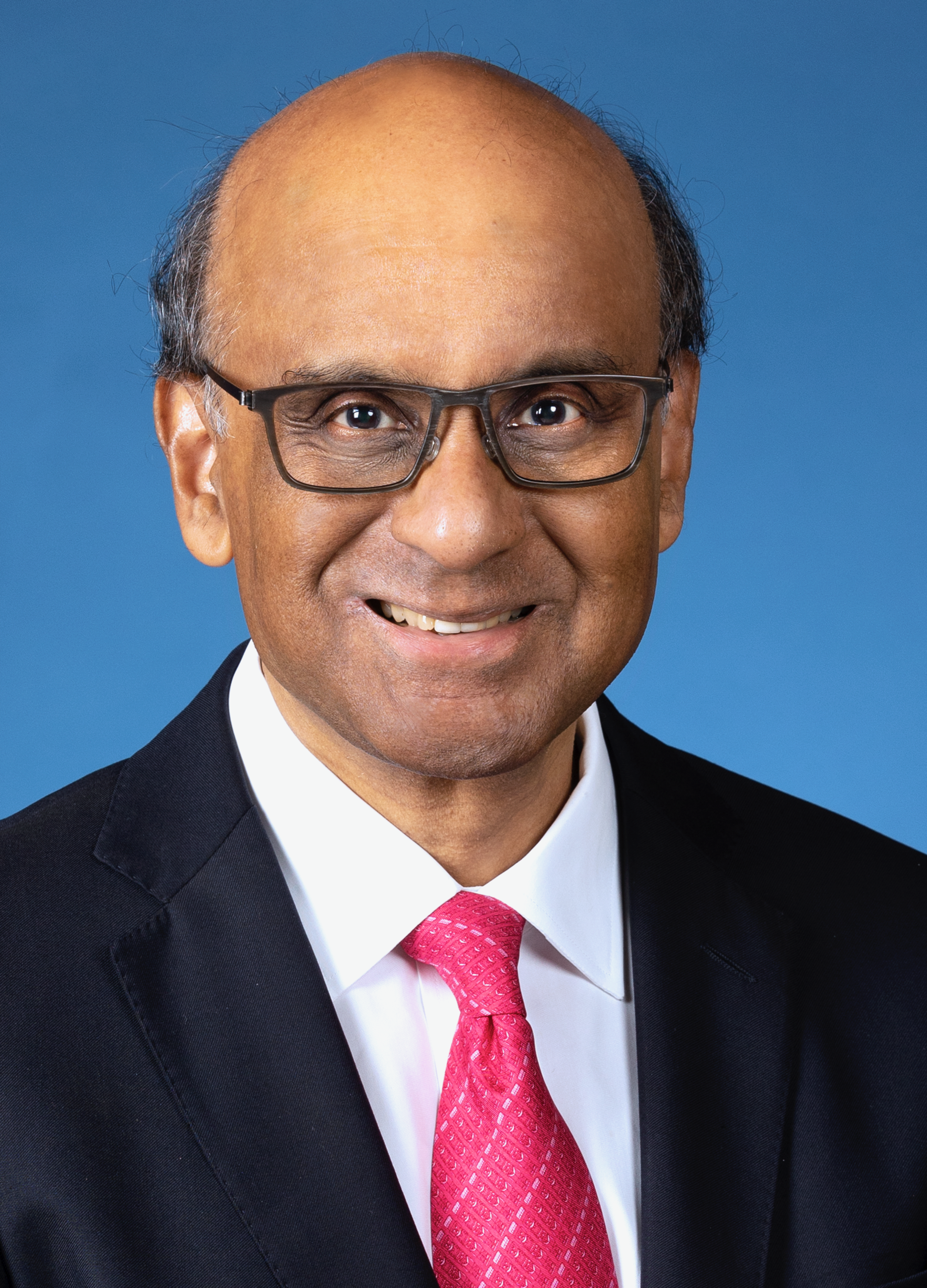
- Incumbent; Tharman Shanmugaratnam since 14 September 2023
- Head of state of the Republic of Singapore
- Style: Mister President (informal); His Excellency (diplomatic)
- Type: Head of state
- Residence: The Istana
- Appointer: Parliament (1965–1991) Direct election (1991–present)
- Term length: Six years, renewable
- Constituting instrument: Constitution of Singapore (1965)
- Precursor: Yang di-Pertuan Negara of Singapore
- Formation: 9 August 1965; 61 years ago
- First holder: Yusof Ishak
- Deputy: Chairman of the Council of Presidential Advisers
- Salary: S$1,540,000 annually ($1,133,598 USD)
- Website: Official website

The president of Singapore, officially the President of the Republic of Singapore, (Note: Malay: Presiden Republik Singapura; Chinese: 新加坡共和國總統; pinyin: Xīnjiāpō Gònghéguó Zǒngtǒng; Tamil: சிங்கப்பூர் குடியரசு குடியரசுத் தலைவர், romanized: Ciṅkappūr Kuṭiyaracu Kuṭiyaracut Talaivar) is the head of state of Singapore. The president represents the country in official diplomatic functions and possesses certain executive powers over the government of Singapore, including the control of the national reserves and the ability to revoke and appoint public service appointments. The President also exercises discretionary powers to veto budgets and to make key public service appointments, consulting the Council of Presidential Advisors.

After Singapore achieved full internal self-governance from the British Empire in 1959, the ceremonial office of the Yang di-Pertuan Negara (lit. 'Lord of the State') was created and first held by William Goode, the prior governor of Singapore. The office was later succeeded by the president of Singapore following Singapore's independence from Malaysia in 1965. The initial role of the president was predominantly a ceremonial institution, serving as the representative of the Singaporean state both at home and abroad. It carried limited residual powers, and prior to 1991, the president was solely appointed by the parliament of Singapore. Singapore follows a non-executive model of the Westminster parliamentary system whereby the president is not the head of government but rather the head of state; political power is instead vested in the Cabinet, which is led by the prime minister.

A constitutional amendment in 1991 introduced the direct election of the president by popular vote, first implemented in the 1993 election. Since then, the elected president has held significant custodial powers, including the reserve power to veto any government budget that, in their judgement and after mandatory consultation with the Council of Presidential Advisers (CPA), would draw on the country's past financial reserves that was accrued under previous governments as part of a check and balance framework. The president also has the power to veto the removal or appointment of key public service, statutory board and government office holders listed in the Fifth Schedule of the Constitution.

Another amendment in 2016 introduced reserved presidential elections for an ethnic community in Singapore if no member of that community had served as president in the preceding five terms. (Note: In Singapore, citizens are classified under the CMIO (Chinese–Malay–Indian–Others) framework.) The office has no term limits. The president has far-reaching formal obligations to act above party politics. Under the Constitution, the president must be a Singaporean citizen, non-partisan and elected by popular vote. The incumbent president is Tharman Shanmugaratnam, who took office on 14 September 2023 after being elected in the 2023 presidential election with 70.41% of the vote.

== History ==
The office of the President of the Republic of Singapore was created on 22 December 1965, retrospective to 9 August 1965, on which Singapore achieved independence from Malaysia. It succeeded the office of Yang di-Pertuan Negara (lit. 'Lord of the State') which was created when Singapore attained full internal self-government from the British Empire in 1959. The last Yang di-Pertuan Negara, Yusof Ishak, became the first President. After his death in 1970, he was succeeded by Benjamin Sheares in 1971 who was appointed by Parliament and served until his death in 1981.

Sheares was succeeded by Devan Nair, who had been the Member of Parliament (MP) for Anson Constituency since 1979; Nair resigned in 1985. Whilst officially said to have resigned for his alcoholism, he disputed the account, claiming that he was forced out of office by former Prime Minister Goh Chok Tong. Nair was succeeded by Wee Kim Wee, the Singaporean ambassador to South Korea and Japan from 1980 to 1984.

Wee served as the President for two terms from 1985 to 1993. For the ensuing presidential election in 1993, the first in Singapore to be decided by popular vote, Wee decided not to contest and retired after his second term had ended. Wee was the first president to exercise custodial powers pursuant to the 1991 constitutional amendments allowing so.

=== Elected presidency ===
In the early 1980s, the ruling People's Action Party (PAP), which had held every parliamentary seat in Singapore since the 1960s, suffered its first electoral setback in almost two decades when J. B. Jeyaretnam of the Workers' Party (WP) won the 1981 Anson by-election. Following this loss, then-Prime Minister Lee Kuan Yew expressed concern about the possibility of a "freak election result" in which the PAP might lose its parliamentary majority, allowing opposition parties what he described as "unfettered access" to the nation's reserves.

As such, in January 1991, a constitutional (Note: Now the Constitution of the Republic of Singapore (1985 Rev. Ed., 1999 Reprint).) amendment was passed by Parliament to redefine the role of the president. The amendment provided that the president would be elected by a popular vote, subject to strict eligibility requirements. The president was also empowered by the amendment to veto the use of the country's reserves and revoke or appoint public service appointments. The president can also examine the government's usage of the Internal Security Act and Maintenance of Religious Harmony Act, and concur with the director of the Corrupt Practices Investigation Bureau (CPIB) to investigate persons for corrupt practices, even if the prime minister refuses consent.

The first elected president was Ong Teng Cheong, who served as Deputy Prime Minister from 1985 to 1993 prior to his presidency, won the 1993 presidential election. He served as president from 1993 to 1999. The Singapore Government officially regarded Ong's predecessor Wee Kim Wee as the first elected president on the basis that he held and exercised the powers of the elected president. This was a result of transitional provisions in the Constitution of Singapore in 2017, which were affirmed by the High Court following a legal challenge by then-presidential candidate Tan Cheng Bock. Tan appealed against this decision, but the appeal was dismissed by the Court of Appeal.

The sixth and the oldest to become president was S. R. Nathan, who served as the Ambassador of the United States from 1990 to 1996 prior to his presidency. He ran unopposed, and became president by virtue of being the sole candidate deemed qualified by the Presidential Elections Committee (PEC). He served his first term of office from 1999 to 2005 before being re-elected unopposed again for a second term, and he served until 2011.

After S. R. Nathan stepped down, Tony Tan, who served as Deputy Prime Minister from 1995 to 2005 prior to his presidency, won the 2011 presidential election by a narrow margin in a four-cornered fight. He was sworn in as the seventh president of Singapore on 1 September 2011. Ong Teng Cheong, Tony Tan, and Tharman Shanmugaratnam are the only Deputy Prime Ministers who became presidents.

In 2016, further amendments to the Constitution were passed providing for "reserved elections" for a particular ethnic community, if that community has not provided a president in the past five presidential terms. The eighth president, Halimah Yacob, who served as Speaker of Parliament from 2013 to 2017, prior to her presidency, took office on 14 September 2017. She was the sole eligible candidate under the new reform terms which took effect earlier that year. Yacob was also the first Malay head of state since Yusof, who died while in office 47 years prior. Yacob was also the first female president. Ethnic identity for the purposes of participating in a reserved election requires both self-identification and approval by a committee set up by the government, rather than being based on specific guidelines.

On 1 September 2023, Tharman Shanmugaratnam, who served as Deputy Prime Minister from 2011 to 2019, and Senior Minister from 2019 to 2023, prior to his presidency, won the 2023 presidential election and was elected the ninth president of Singapore after receiving 70.41% of the votes cast. In November 2023, the parliament of Singapore passed a bill to amend the constitution to allow the President of Singapore to hold international positions in their private capacity, only if the position is of national interest.

== Constitutional role ==
The president is the head of state of Singapore. In addition to being the head of state, it is also the function of the president to safeguard the national reserves and the integrity of the public service of Singapore. The executive authority of Singapore is vested in the president and exercisable by them or by the Cabinet or any minister authorised by the Cabinet. However, the Constitution vests "general direction and control of the Government" in the Cabinet. In most cases, the president is bound to exercise their powers in accordance with the advice of the Cabinet or of a minister acting under the general authority of the Cabinet.

However, the president is able to exercise some powers in their personal discretion such as preventing the government of the day from drawing on the reserves which were not accumulated during its current term of office; revoking or appointing any of the public offices under Article 22 of the Constitution such as Chief Justice, Attorney-General, Chief of Defence Force, and Commissioner of Police, amongst others; exercising oversight over the Corrupt Practices Investigation Bureau (CPIB); and decisions of the Executive under the Internal Security Act and the Maintenance of Religious Harmony Act.

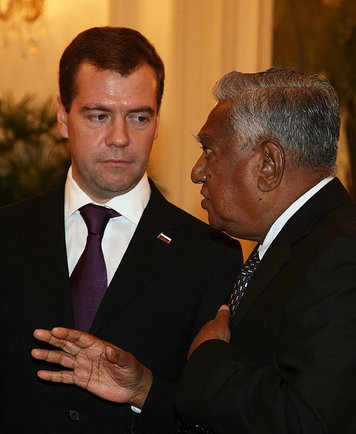
Russian president Dmitry Medvedev speaking to president S. R. Nathan during the former's visit in 2009

As a component of the legislature together with the parliament, the president is also jointly vested with legislative authority. The president's primary role in the exercise of legislative power to make laws is assenting to bills passed by Parliament.

As the president exercises this constitutional function in accordance with the Cabinet's advice and not in their personal discretion except in certain circumstances, they may not refuse to assent to bills that Parliament has validly passed. The words of enactment in Singapore Statutes are: "Be it enacted by the president with the advice and consent of the Parliament of Singapore, as follows:". The president usually opens each parliamentary session with an address drafted by the Cabinet setting out the government's agenda for the session, and may address Parliament and send messages to it.

The president has been called "Singapore's No. 1 diplomat". Ambassadors and high commissioners accredited to Singapore present their credentials to the president, and the president is called upon by visiting foreign dignitaries. In addition, the president contributes to the nation's external relations by undertaking overseas trips on Cabinet's advice. The president also serves as the ex officio chancellor of both the National University of Singapore and the Nanyang Technological University.

Presidents have also used the office to champion charitable causes. Wee Kim Wee promoted sports and volunteerism; Ong Teng Cheong promoted culture and the arts, particularly music; and S. R. Nathan established the President's Challenge with the Ministry of Community Development, Youth and Sports and its statutory board, the National Council of Social Service. As of 2011, the endeavour had raised more than S$100 million for charities supporting disabled and needy people.

== Powers ==
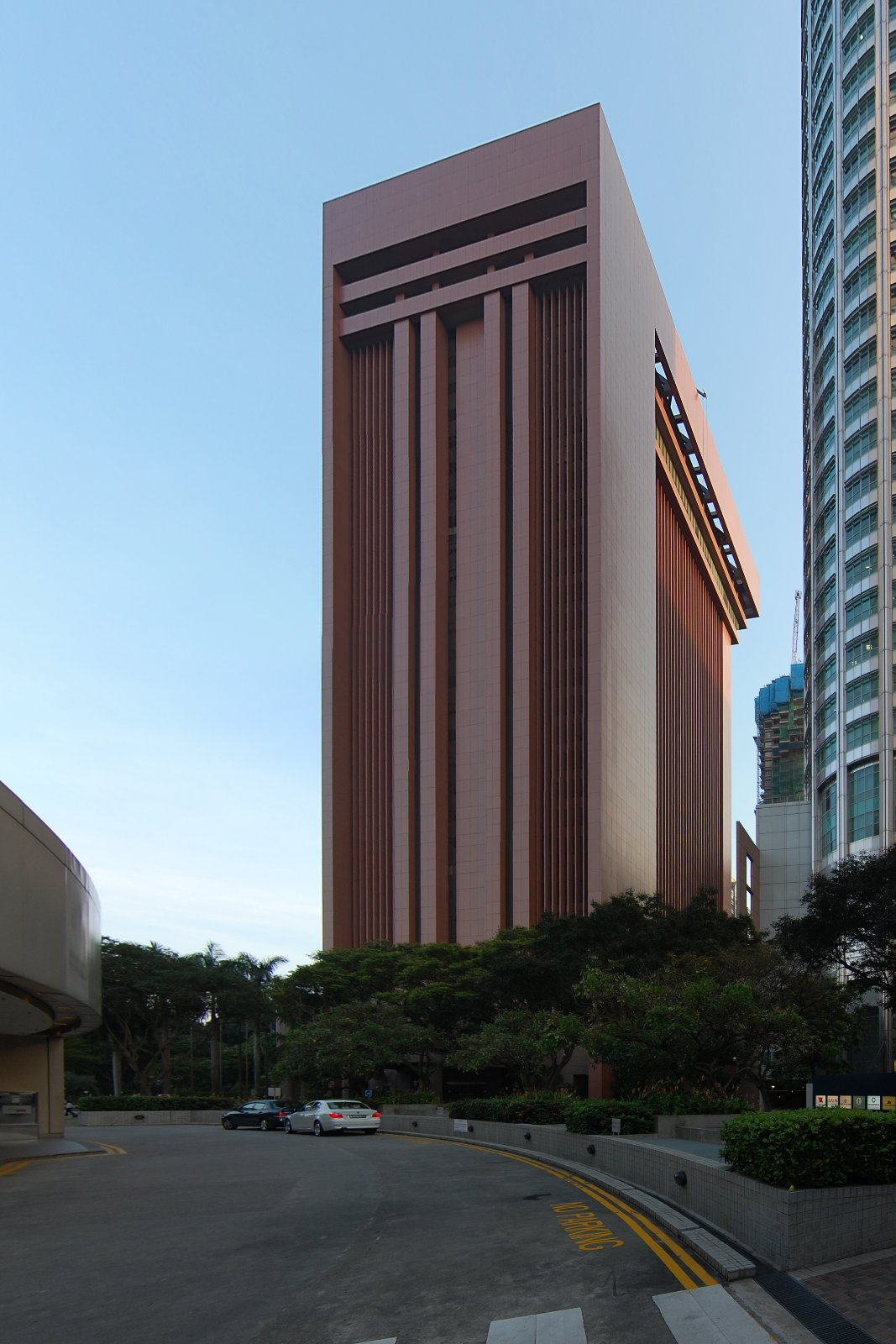
The president has personal discretion as to whether to approve budgets or financial transactions of specified statutory boards and state-owned companies that are likely to draw on past reserves. The Monetary Authority of Singapore, photographed here in September 2009, is one such statutory board.

The powers of the president are divided into those which the president may exercise in their own discretion, and those which must be exercised in accordance with the advice of the Cabinet or of a minister acting under the general authority of the Cabinet. In addition, the president is required to consult the Council of Presidential Advisers (CPA) when performing some of their functions. In other cases, they may consult the CPA if they wish to but is not bound to do so.

The Constitution confers on the president certain executive functions to block attempts by the government of the day to draw down reserves that it did not accumulate. Thus, a guarantee may only be given or a loan raised by the government if the president concurs, and their approval is also needed for budgets of specified statutory boards and state-owned companies that draw on their past reserves.

The president also possesses personal discretion to withhold assent to any bill in Parliament providing directly or indirectly for the direct or indirect variation, changing or increase in powers of the Central Provident Fund Board to invest moneys belonging to it; and the borrowing of money, the giving of any guarantee or the raising of any loan by the government if in the president's opinion the bill is likely to draw on reserves not accumulated by the Government during its current term of office. In addition, the president may withhold assent to any Supply Bill, Supplementary Supply Bill or Final Supply Bill for any financial year if in their opinion the estimates of revenue and expenditure, supplementary estimates or statement of excess are likely to lead to a drawing on past reserves.

The president is also empowered to approve changes to key political appointments, such as the chief justice, attorney-general, chairman and members of the Public Service Commission, Chief of Defence Force and the Commissioner of Police. They also appoint the Prime Minister, a Member of Parliament (MP) who, in their opinion, is likely to command the confidence of a majority of MPs. The president has certain powers of oversight over the Corrupt Practices Investigation Bureau and decisions of the Executive under the Internal Security Act and the Maintenance of Religious Harmony Act.

Under the Singapore Armed Forces Act, the president has the authority to raise and maintain the Singapore Armed Forces (SAF). The president also has the power to form, disband or amalgamate units within the SAF.

The term of office of the first elected president, Ong Teng Cheong, was marked by the differences between the government and him, concerning the extent of his discretionary fiscal powers. Discussions culminated in the government issuing a non-binding white paper entitled The Principles for Determining and Safeguarding the Accumulated Reserves of the Government and the Fifth Schedule Statutory Boards and Government Companies (1999).

In 2009, the government had to request for the approval from president S. R. Nathan to draw $4.9 billion from past financial reserves to meet current budget expenditure, the first time it had done so. The sum was used to fund the government's Resilience Package consisting of two schemes aimed at preserving jobs and businesses during the Great Recession.

== Election ==
=== Qualifications ===
A person who wishes to run for the office of president has to fulfil stringent qualifications set out in the Constitution, which are as follows:

- The president must be a citizen of Singapore.
- The president must not be less than 45 years of age.
- The president's name must appear in a current register of electors.
- The president must be resident in Singapore at the date of their nomination for election, and must have been so resident for periods amounting in the aggregate to not less than ten years prior to that date.
- The president must not be subject to any of the following disqualifications:

(a) being and having been found or declared to be of unsound mind;
(b) being an undischarged bankrupt;
(c) holding an office of profit;
(d) having been nominated for election to Parliament or the office of President or having acted as election agent to a person so nominated, failing to lodge any return of election expenses required by law within the time and in the manner so required;
(e) having been convicted of an offence by a court of law (whether in Singapore or not) and sentenced to imprisonment for a term of not less than one year or to a fine of not less than S$10,000 (or equivalent in foreign currency) and having not received a free pardon. The person if convicted by a foreign court of law shall not be disqualified unless the offence is also one which, had it been committed in Singapore, would have been punishable by a court of law in Singapore;
(f) having voluntarily acquired the citizenship of, or exercised rights of citizenship in, a foreign country, or having made a declaration of allegiance to a foreign country;
(g) being disqualified under any law relating to offences in connection with elections to Parliament or the office of President by reason of having been convicted of such an offence or having in proceedings relating to such an election been proved guilty of an act constituting such an offence.

- The president must be a person of integrity, good character and reputation.
- The president must not be a member of any political party on the date of their nomination for election.
- The president must have for a period of not less than three years held office —
  - as Minister, Chief Justice, Speaker, Attorney-General, Chairman of the Public Service Commission, Auditor-General, Accountant-General, or Permanent Secretary;
  - as chief executive officer (CEO) of a key statutory board or government company: the Central Provident Fund Board, the Housing and Development Board, the Jurong Town Corporation, the Monetary Authority of Singapore, Temasek Holdings, or GIC Private Limited (formerly known as the Government of Singapore Investment Corporation);
  - as the most senior executive of a company incorporated in Singapore with an average of $500 million in shareholders' equity for the most recent three years in that office, and which is profitable after taxes; or
  - in any other similar or comparable position of seniority and responsibility in any other organisation or department of equivalent size or complexity in the public or private sector which has given him such experience and ability in administering and managing financial affairs as to enable him to carry out effectively the functions and duties of the office of president.

The strictness of these qualifications led to the 1999, 2005, and 2017 elections being walkovers as only one candidate had qualified on nomination day.

In November 2016, further amendments provide for "reserved elections" for a particular racial group (Chinese, Malay, and Indian/other minority) — if that community has not been represented for five presidential terms. Other amendments were made to expand the list of key government companies eligible for the candidacy, and, for candidates using their private sector experience, the use of $500 million of shareholder equity instead of $100 million in paid-up capital. The changes went into effect in April 2017. Prime minister Lee Hsien Loong later explained that while he expected the "reserved election" policy to be unpopular among the population, he believed it was "the right thing to do".

=== Election procedure ===
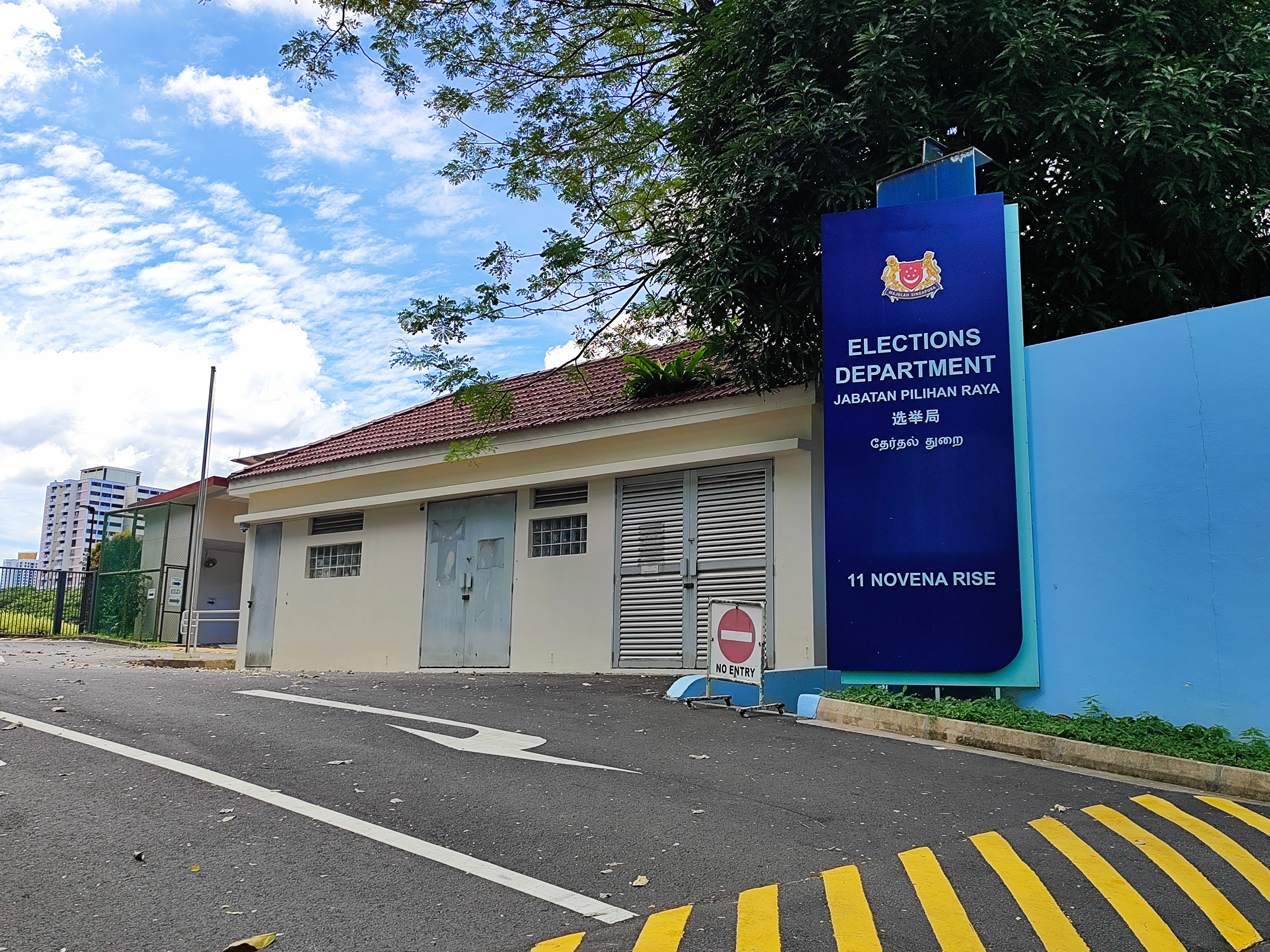
The Elections Department, which oversees elections in Singapore

The president holds office for a term of six years from the date on which they assume office. The office falls vacant upon the expiry of the incumbent's term or if the president is for some reason unable to complete their term; for example, due to death, resignation, or removal from office for misconduct or mental or physical infirmity. If the office of president becomes vacant before the incumbent's term expires, a poll for an election must be held within six months. In other cases, an election can take place any time from three months before the expiry of the incumbent's term of office.

The procedure for elections is laid out in the Presidential Elections Act. The process begins when the prime minister issues a writ of election to the returning officer specifying the date and place of nomination day. Potential candidates must obtain certificates of eligibility from the Presidential Elections Committee (PEC), the function of which is to ensure that such persons have the necessary qualifications to be nominated as a candidate for the election. In particular, the PEC must be satisfied that the potential candidates are persons of integrity, good character and reputation; and if they have not previously held certain key government offices or acted as chairman of the board of directors or CEO of a company incorporated or registered under the Companies Act with shareholders' equity of at least $500 million, that they held a position of comparable seniority and responsibility in the public or private sector that has given them experience and ability in administering and managing financial affairs. The PEC consists of the chairman of the Public Service Commission, who is also the chairman of the PEC, the chairman of the Accounting and Corporate Regulatory Authority, and a member of the Presidential Council for Minority Rights. For the 2017 presidential election, the members of the PEC were Eddie Teo (chairman), Lim Soo Hoon, Chan Heng Chee, Po'ad Shaik Abu Bakar Mattar, Tay Yong Kwang, and Peter Seah.

In addition, candidates must obtain political donation certificates from the registrar of political donations stating that they have complied with the Political Donations Act, and file their nomination papers with the returning officer on nomination day. A deposit must also be paid. The candidate is declared to have been elected president if only one candidate is nominated. Otherwise, the returning officer issues a notice of contested election specifying when polling day will be.

During the election period, a candidate may not spend more than $600,000 or 30 cents for each person on the electoral register, whichever is greater. Permits must be obtained to hold election meetings and display posters and banners, and a number of acts are unlawful, including bribery, dissuading electors from voting, making false statements about candidates, treating and undue influence. Legal changes introduced in 2010 made the eve of polling day a "cooling-off day" – campaigning must not take place on that day and on polling day itself.

Polling day is a public holiday, and voting is compulsory. Voters must go to the polling stations assigned to them. After the poll closes, the presiding officer of each polling station seals the ballot boxes without opening them. Candidates or their polling agents may also affix their own seals to the ballot boxes. The ballot boxes are then taken to counting centres to be opened and the ballots counted. A candidate or his or her counting agent may ask the returning officer for a recount of votes if the difference between the number of votes for the candidate with the most votes and any other candidate's number of votes is 2% or less. After all counts, and recounts if any, have been completed, the returning officer ascertains whether the total number of electors registered to vote overseas is less than the difference between the number of votes for the two candidates with the highest number of votes. If so, the returning officer declares the candidate with the highest number of votes to be elected as president. If not, the overseas votes may be decisive. The returning officer then states the number of votes cast for each candidate and the date and location where the overseas votes will be counted.

=== Last contested election ===
The 2023 presidential election was the first election with a ballot since the 2011 election. The election was won by Tharman Shanmugaratnam with 1,746,427 (70.40%) of valid votes.

Sample counts were announced at about 22:42 and showed that Tharman Shanmugaratnam was leading with 70% of the votes, followed by Ng Kok Song with 16%, and Tan Kin Lian with 14%. At about 23:15, Ng conceded during a press conference and congratulated Tharman, stating that there was a clear result and there was no need to wait for the final results. At about 23:30, Tan congratulated Tharman, but refused to concede until the actual results were announced. The local results were announced at about 00:23 the next day.

The final turnout (excluding the overseas electorate) was 2,530,912 (93.41%), lower than 2011's and 2020's turnouts of 94.80% and 95.81%, respectively. The Elections Department published the overseas vote count on 12 September. Only 3,799 votes were accepted for counting, of which only 78 votes were rejected. Tharman Shanmugaratnam, Ng Kok Song, and Tan Kin Lian garnered 2,834 (76.16%), 595 (15.99%), and 292 (7.85%) votes, respectively, which saw only a 0.01% change in Tharman's and Tan's respective voting percentages. ELD also said that 2,997 postal votes had been downloaded and 2,263 mails were received as of the cut-off date of 11 September, of which only 1,345 had been accepted. The final turnout was 2,534,711, increasing its percentage by 0.14%, from 93.41% to 93.55%.

Candidate	Votes	%
Tharman Shanmugaratnam	1,749,261	70.41
Ng Kok Song	390,636	15.72
Tan Kin Lian	344,584	13.87
Total	2,484,481	100.00
Valid votes	2,484,481	98.02
Invalid/blank votes	50,230	1.98
Total votes	2,534,711	100.00
Registered voters/turnout	2,709,455	93.55
Source: Elections Department

== Assumption of office and disabilities ==
The person elected to the office of president assumes office on the day his predecessor ceases to hold office or, if the office is vacant, on the day following the election. Upon assumption of office, the president is required to take and subscribe in the presence of the chief justice or of another justice of the Supreme Court the Oath of Office, which states:

I, [name], having been elected President of the Republic of Singapore, do solemnly swear (or affirm) that I will faithfully discharge my duties as such to the best of my ability without fear or favour, affection or ill-will, and without regard to any previous affiliation with any political party, and that I will bear true faith and allegiance to the Republic, and that I will preserve, protect and defend the Constitution of the Republic of Singapore.

If the President is a Christian, They may utter the phrase in the last sentence, "So help me God".

Once elected, the president shall:

- not hold any other office created or recognised by the Constitution;
- not actively engage in any commercial enterprise;
- not be a member of any political party; and
- not serve in Parliament.

== Succession ==
In the case when the president is unable to perform their duties, their powers are temporarily transferred to the chairman of the Council of Presidential Advisers (CPA). If the chairman of the Council of Presidential Advisers is not available, the speaker of the Parliament performs the duties of the president. If both are unavailable the presidential functions are performed by an individual appointed by the Parliament.

== Salary and entitlements ==
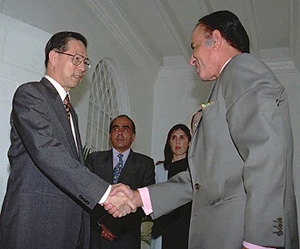
President Ong Teng Cheong received by Carlos Menem.

The Parliament of Singapore is required to provide a civil list for the maintenance of the president, and it does so by way of the Civil List and Gratuity Act. With effect from 17 February 2012, the sum under Class I of the list, which includes the president's personal pay ($1,568,900, known by the British term the "privy purse"), an entertainment allowance ($73,000) and an allowance for an acting president ($4,500), is $1,646,400. The privy purse was reduced from $4,267,500 after the president accepted the Ministerial Salaries Review Committee's recommendations on the matter.

The salaries for the president's personal staff (Class II) amount to $4,532,400. Speaking in Parliament on 10 March 2011, finance minister Tharman Shanmugaratnam explained that this sum was to cater for the salaries of an additional staff officer to support the work of the Council of Presidential Advisers, and a butler manager; and to meet higher variable staff salary payments due to the nation's strong economic growth. The allowance for the Istana's household expenses (Class III) is $2,762,308, an increase from $694,000. This allowance is used to cover the maintenance of the Istana, vehicles, utilities and other supplies, as well as for ceremonies and celebrations. The increase was to cater for higher expenses for maintaining computer systems, buildings and land, and to account for inflation.

Class IV expenses for "special services" are $550,000. In previous years, this sum was used to cover various expenses such as the cost of replacing state cars and installing a new document repository. Overall, the current civil list of $9,491,100 represents a decrease of about 18% from the sum for the past fiscal year of $11,605,000.

== See also ==
- Spouse of the President of Singapore
- Chief Justice of Singapore
- Prime Minister of Singapore
