= IDSS =

IDSS can mean:

- Institute for Defence and Strategic Studies
- Intelligent decision support systems
- International Docking System Standard, for spacecraft
