= 1999 Singaporean presidential election =

- 18 August 1999
- Registered: 1,967,984 (▲12.04%)
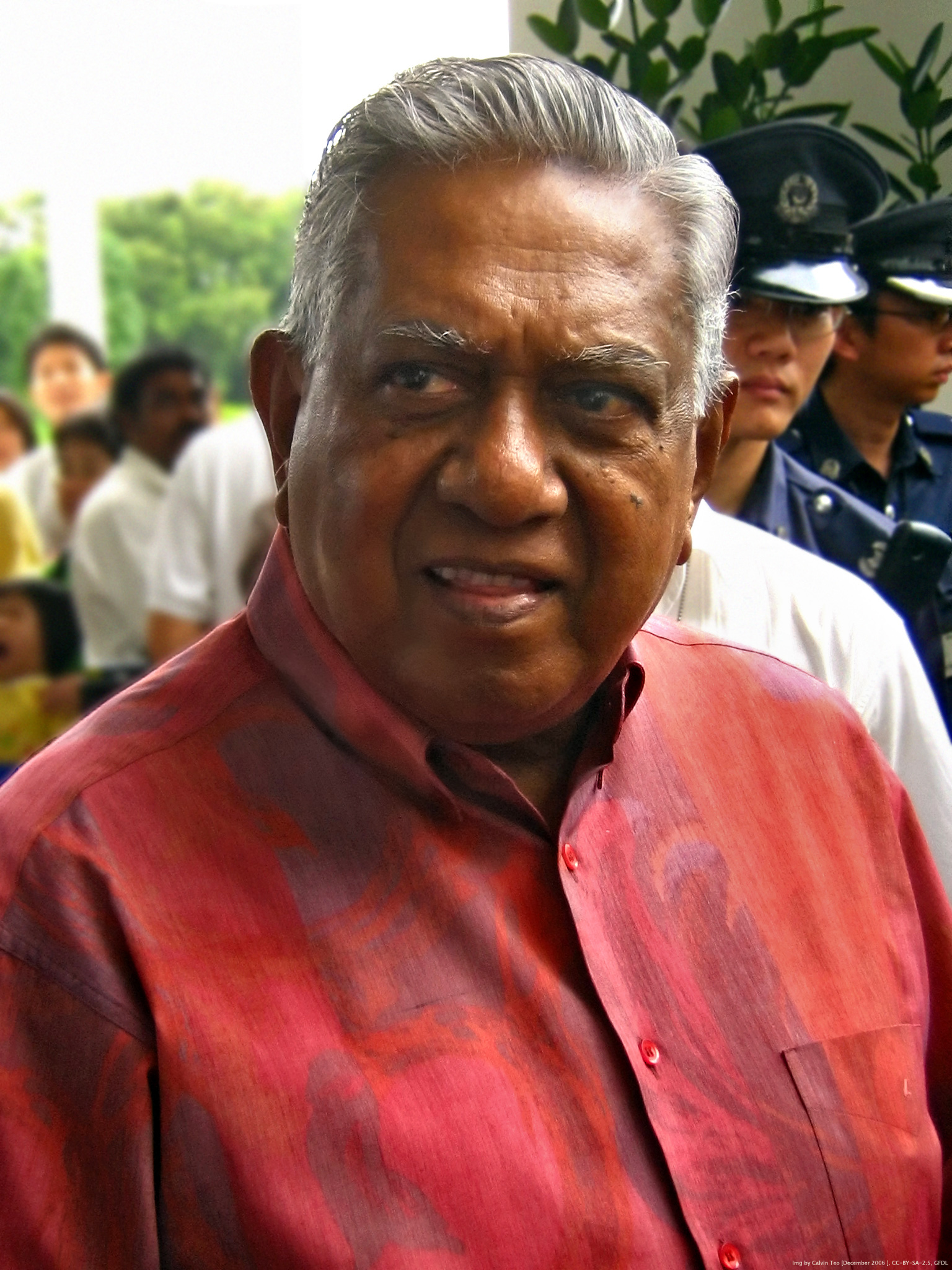
Nominee	Sellapan Ramanathan
Party	Independent
Popular vote	Unopposed
President before election
Ong Teng Cheong
Independent
Elected President
Sellapan Ramanathan
Independent

Presidential elections were scheduled to be held in Singapore on 18 August 1999.

S.R. Nathan previously served as Singapore's Ambassador to the United States from 1990 to 1996 and was elected in an uncontested election due to the lack of eligible candidates. He was sworn in as the sixth President of Singapore on 1 September 1999. As of 2026, Nathan was also the first (and to date, the only) President-elect without any direct affiliation to any political party or a prior record of political experience.

== Candidates ==
Only S. R. Nathan's Certificate of Eligibility was accepted while the two other candidates were rejected.

=== Eligible ===
Candidates	Background	Outcome
S. R. Nathan	Seconded to the National Trades Union Congress, and then worked in the Ministry of Foreign Affairs and Ministry of Home Affairs. He was the Ambassador-at-large of Institute for Defence and Strategic Studies.	Application for the Certificate of Eligibility Accepted.

=== Declared Ineligible ===
Candidates	Background	Outcome
Ooi Boon Ewe	A member of the People's Liberal Democratic Party. He submitted eligibility forms to the Elections Department but was declared ineligible.	Application for the Certificate of Eligibility rejected.
Tan Soo Phuan	The Secretary-General of the Democratic Progressive Party. He submitted eligibility forms to the Elections Department but was declared ineligible.	Application for the Certificate of Eligibility rejected.

=== Declined to be candidate ===
Candidates	Background
Ong Teng Cheong	The incumbent and fifth president of Singapore, he decided not to seek re-election for a second term, partially due to the death of his wife.
