= Andrew Kuan =

Singaporean politician

Kuan Yoke Loon, commonly known as Andrew Kuan (simplified Chinese: 关玉麟; traditional Chinese: 關玉麟; pinyin: Guān Yù Lín) is the managing director of executive search firm Blue Arrow. From 2001 to 2004, Kuan was the group chief financial officer of the Jurong Town Corporation, one of four designated statutory boards that confer eligibility to contest in the presidential elections.

Kuan applied to run as a candidate in the 2005 Singapore presidential election. However, his application for a Certificate of Eligibility was rejected as his seniority and responsibility as JTC's Group Chief Financial Officer were, in the opinion of the Presidential Elections Committee (PEC), not comparable to those required under the Constitution.

== Presidential Election ==
=== 2005 Singaporean presidential election ===
Kuan joined the People's Action Party (PAP) in 1999, and left in 2005 to qualify for the presidential elections.

Kuan announced his intention to compete in the 2005 Singapore presidential election where the incumbent president S R Nathan is a candidate. However his application for a certificate of eligibility to compete was unsuccessful resulting to Kuan alleging conspiratorial theories involving the government. Kuan was subsequently disqualified by the Presidential Elections Committee (PEC) for failing to meet the criteria for running for President in Singapore. The Committee said Mr Kuan's seniority and responsibility as JTC's Group Chief Financial Officer were not comparable to those required under the Constitution. A presidential candidate is required to have experience as chairman or chief executive officer of a statutory board or a company with a paid-up capital of at least S$100 million.

Singaporean media have reported extensively on the circumstances surrounding Kuan's departure from his condominium's management council in 2001. Kuan originally said he left amicably, but later admitted to being voted out with 13 council members voting against him, 2 abstaining and 1 voting for him. Kuan attributed this to enmity aroused after he filed a police report against council member Chia Boon Teck, accusing him of forging signatures. The case was closed without prosecution, but Chia filed a defamation suit against Kuan in 2005 after details of the case and his identity were leaked by The New Paper. Kuan had apologised unreservedly to Chia for embarrassment and distress that his statements had caused. They had reached an out-of-court settlement for the defamation suit, the settlement included compensation for damages as well as legal costs.

On 9 August 2005, Singapore's Prime Minister, Lee Hsien Loong, called for all candidates to be open about their records, so that Singaporeans can make an informed judgement on them. He also encouraged Andrew Kuan's former employers to come forward, speak freely and tell Singaporeans what they know about him. On 11 August 2005, Kuan's former employer government-linked JTC Corporation called a news conference to provide details on the circumstances leading to Kuan's resignation in July 2004. Chong Lit Cheong, chief executive officer of JTC Corporation said that Andrew Kuan's work at JTC was unsatisfactory since his first year there and was asked to resign twice on 2003 and 2004. No details of why his work was unsatisfactory were provided, other than to note that no fraud or other crime was involved and that Mr Kuan required "quite a fair bit of hand holding". In reply, Kuan noted that he had worked at JTC Corporation for 37 months, extending his contract several times, and he was given performance bonuses and a raise during this period.

=== 2011 Singaporean presidential election ===
Kuan announced his intention to contest in the 2011 presidential elections. Kuan was deemed ineligible once more by the PEC for failing to meet the criteria for running for President in Singapore. The Committee said in a statement that Mr Kuan's seniority and responsibility as JTC's Group Chief Financial Officer were not comparable to positions listed under the Constitution.
