= President's Challenge =

Charity campaign in Singapore

The President's Challenge is an annual campaign in Singapore supported by the kindness and generosity of people from all walks of life, regardless of culture, religion or family background, to help those less fortunate — specifically for the beneficiaries that are annually selected by the President's Office. It was established by President S. R. Nathan in 2000 and continued by his successors President Tony Tan, Halimah Yacob and incumbent President Tharman Shanmugaratnam.

Many partners of the President's Challenge come from schools, private organisations, ministries and government bodies. The Challenge has raised over $170 million and rallied over 87,000 volunteers since its establishment in 2000.

== Overview ==
Before the establishment of President's Challenge, there were several charity projects under the President S. R. Nathan's name. In 2000, President S R Nathan initiated the consolidation of all these events under a single umbrella of President's Challenge so that it will be a single platform for different sectors e.g. corporations, schools and individuals to engage with charity. President's Challenge was founded on President S. R. Nathan's vision of Singapore being a compassionate nation whereby Singaporeans will be conscious of the less fortunate around them and graciously help them through volunteering and any other way possible.

A similar charity event, the President’s Challenge Night (known as President's Star Charity till 2023) was initiated by President Ong Teng Cheong.

== Beneficiaries ==
Any voluntary welfare organisation in Singapore with an approved Institution of a Public Character (IPC) can apply to be a President's Challenge beneficiary each year. Upon submission, the President's Office selects a number of beneficiaries for the disbursement of funds raised during President's Challenge for that year. The amounts disbursed to each beneficiary is varied and at the President's discretion.

== Partners ==
=== Corporate partners ===
==== Microsoft Singapore ====
2010 marked the tenth year of Microsoft Singapore's support of President's Challenge in general fundraising and its fourth year in organising a major fundraising event.

==== The Singapore Totalisator Board and Singapore Pools (Private) Limited ====
The Singapore Totalisator Board and Singapore Pools (Private) Limited has supported President's Challenge since 2000 by absorbing the administrative costs of President's Challenge so that all funds raised from donors go directly towards the beneficiaries. The Singapore Totalisator Board and Singapore Pools (Private) Limited have also organised fundraising activities and has raised about $790,000 for President's Challenge since 2007.

==== Mediacorp ====
Mediacorp has supported the President's Challenge since 2000 by organising the annual President's Star Charity, a fundraising concert featuring local and international artistes, performing alongside beneficiaries. In 2021, over $10 million in donations was raised at the end of the show.

=== Educational institutions ===
==== Temasek Secondary School ====
Temasek Secondary School has been a supporter of President's Challenge since 2005. They have been creatively organising record breaking events every year.

==== Nanyang Family of Schools ====
Nanyang Family of Schools has been supporting President's Challenge since 2009.
