= Ooi Boon Ewe =

Singaporean politician

- 黄文优

Personal details
- Born: Stephen Ooi Boon Ewe; 14 November 1941 (age 85) Singapore, Straits Settlements
- Party: Independent (1999–2006; 2011–present)
- Other political affiliations: People's Liberal Democratic Party (2006–2011)

Stephen Ooi Boon Ewe (simplified Chinese: 黄文优; traditional Chinese: 黃文優; Pe̍h-ōe-jī: Ûiⁿ Bûn-iu; pinyin: Huáng Wényōu; born 14 November 1941) is a Singaporean perennial political candidate. He is most notable for attempting to contest various elections, general and presidential, without a record of success. He attempted to contest presidential elections in 1999, 2005, 2011 and 2017. However, in each instance his application for the certificate of eligibility was rejected, due to reasons such as not finding assentors to sponsor him and incomplete nomination forms.

== Biography ==
Ooi was reportedly a former private tutor and property executive.

=== Politics ===
Ooi entered the political arena in the presidential elections in 1999. He submitted eligibility forms to the Elections Department who later declined to issue a certificate of eligibility.

Ooi contested Joo Chiat Single Member Constituency (SMC) in the 2001 General Elections as an independent candidate, against People's Action Party incumbent Chan Soo Sen. He lost to Chan, garnering 3,038 votes (16.45%).

Ooi attempted to seek presidential candidacy for the second time in the presidential elections in 2005. His application for the Certificate of Eligibility was rejected by the Presidential Elections Committee due to his lack of experience and ability required by the Constitution.

In 2006, he formed the People's Liberal Democratic Party, four days after Nomination Day of the 2006 general election. He was thus unable to contest the election.

In 2011, Ooi sought to contest Sengkang West SMC in the 2011 General Elections, and attempted to promote himself by singing an impromptu election jingle on television. One of his assentors did not turn up on Nomination Day and he was unsuccessful in attempting to seek a replacement from the crowd. He then left the nomination centre without submitting his nomination papers.

Ooi decided on a third run for the presidential election in 2011. As the constitution requires presidential candidates to be nonpartisan, Ooi had to resign from the PLDP. He submitted his forms on 11 July, and was found to be ineligible because his application was incomplete and he had asked for a waiver from certain requirements set forth by the constitution, which the Elections Department claims it has no power to do.

Ooi was the first to collect nomination paperwork for the 2013 Singaporean by-election in Punggol East. Ooi dropped out of the hustings when he failed to file nomination papers on Nomination Day. He claimed that he had lost his political donation certificate, in addition to failing to find assentors, and having his driver abscond with the deposit. He launched into a profanity-laden rant when interviewed after the defeat, accusing the mainstream media of discriminating against independent candidates.

Ooi applied to contest in the presidential election of 2017. However, his application was rejected due to the election being reserved for candidates from the Malay community.

Ooi applied again in the 2020 General Elections under the Bukit Panjang SMC, but did not qualify. Ooi was the first among the four known independent candidates to have announced their candidacy for the election, but only one candidate, Cheang Peng Wah (in Pioneer SMC) has been successfully nominated.

Ooi collected nomination paperwork for 2025 Singaporean general election and intended to contest at Jalan Kayu SMC. However, he was not announced as a candidate on Nomination Day on 23 April 2025.

== See also ==
- Zeng Guoyuan, another Singaporean perennial candidate
