= 2005 Singaporean presidential election =

- 17 August 2005
- Registered: 2,113,540 (▲7.40%)
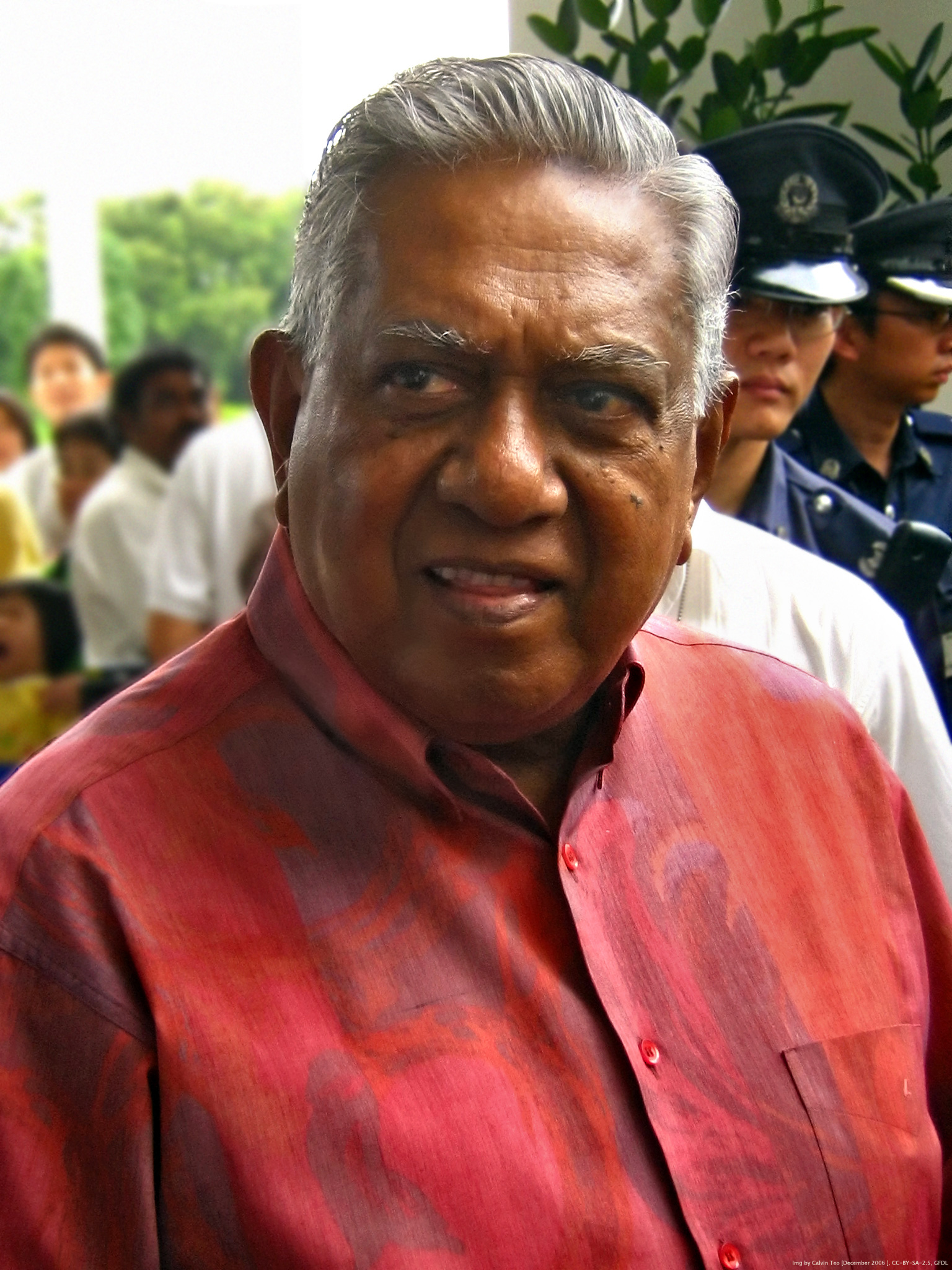
Nominee	Sellapan Ramanathan
Party	Independent
Popular vote	Unopposed
President before election
Sellapan Ramanathan
Independent
Elected President
Sellapan Ramanathan
Independent

Presidential elections were scheduled to be held in Singapore on 17 August 2005. 21 application forms for the Certificate of Eligibility required to contest were collected, and forms were submitted by four candidates.

S.R. Nathan was the only candidate to stand nominated and thus was re-elected uncontested due to the lack of other eligible candidates. S.R. Nathan previously served as Singapore's Ambassador to the United States from 1990 to 1996. He continued his second term as the sixth President of Singapore.

== Candidates ==
=== Eligible ===
Candidates	Background	Outcome
S. R. Nathan	Seconded to the National Trades Union Congress, and then worked in the Ministry of Foreign Affairs and Ministry of Home Affairs. He was once the Ambassador-at-large of Institute for Defence and Strategic Studies and now the Incumbent President of Singapore.	Application for the Certificate of Eligibility Accepted.

=== Declared Ineligible ===
Candidates	Background	Outcome
Kuan Yoke Loon Andrew	Kuan was the former chief financial officer of Jurong Town Corporation (JTC). Independent media in Singapore widely speculated that the PAP government was not prepared for Kuan's candidacy, with the Think Centre NGO accusing the state media of "badmouthing" him. He submitted eligibility forms to the Elections Department but was declared ineligible.	Application for the Certificate of Eligibility rejected.
Ooi Boon Ewe	Ooi was a real estate executive. His application for the Certificate of Eligibility was rejected by the Presidential Elections Committee due to his lack of experience and ability required by the Constitution. He submitted eligibility forms to the Elections Department but was declared ineligible.	Application for the Certificate of Eligibility rejected.
Ramachandran Govindasamy Naidu	His application for the Certificate of Eligibility was rejected by the Presidential Elections Committee due to his lack of experience and ability required by the Constitution. He submitted eligibility forms to the Elections Department but was declared ineligible.	Application for the Certificate of Eligibility rejected.

==== Andrew Kuan's background ====
On 9 August, Prime Minister Lee Hsien Loong called for all candidates to be open about their records so that Singaporeans could make an informed judgment on them. He also encouraged Andrew Kuan's former employers to come forward, speak freely, and tell Singaporeans what they knew about him.

On 11 August, Kuan's former employer, JTC, held a news conference to outline the circumstances leading to Kuan's resignation in July 2004. Chong Lit Cheong, JTC's chief executive officer, stated that Andrew Kuan's work at JTC had been unsatisfactory since his first year there, and he had been asked to resign twice, once in 2003 and again in 2004. No details as to how his work was unsatisfactory were provided, other than a note that no fraud or other crime was involved, and he needed "quite a fair bit of handholding". In reply, Kuan noted that he had worked at JTC Corporation for 37 months, which had extended his contract several times, and he had been given performance bonuses and a raise during this period. Another company, Hyflux, also publicly criticised Kuan.

Later, Kuan was disqualified by the Presidential Elections Committee for failing to meet the criteria for running for president. The committee said Kuan's seniority and responsibility as JTC's chief financial officer were not comparable to those required by the Constitution. A presidential candidate is required to have had experience as the chairman or CEO of a statutory board or of a company with a paid-up capital of at least S$100 million.
