= People's Liberal Democratic Party =

Dormant opposition political party in Singapore

- Chinese name: 人民自由民主党; Rénmín Zìyóu Mínzhǔdǎng
- Malay name: Parti Liberal Demokratik Rakyat ڤرتي ليبر ديموکراتيک رعيت
- Tamil name: மக்கள் தாராண்மை ஜனநாயக கட்சி Makkaḷ tārāṇmai jaṉanāyaka kaṭci
- Founder: Ooi Boon Ewe
- Founded: 2 May 2006; 19 years ago
- Dissolved: 4 December 2025; 1 day ago
- Ideology: Social democracy; Anti-capitalism

The People's Liberal Democratic Party (abbreviation: PLDP) was a political party in Singapore. It was formed by Ooi Boon Ewe, an independent candidate in the 2001 general election in Singapore. The party was approved in the midst of the 2006 general election hustling, but was days late for nomination.

== Elections ==
As PLDP was registered after nomination day for the 2006 general election, Ooi was not able to contest the election under the PLDP banner.

PLDP attempted to contest in the 2011 general election, with Ooi running for the Sengkang West Single Member Constituency. However, on Nomination Day, Ooi's assentor did not turn up, leading to Ooi publicly appealing to the opposition's supporters to be his assentor but to be rejected by the crowd. He subsequently shed tears over again the inability to participate in elections, being in his 70s and having desired to become a Member of Parliament.

Later in 2011, Ooi resigned as PLDP's chairman to contest in the 2011 presidential election as the presidential candidate must be a non-partisan member.

On 7 August 2025, the Singapore Ministry of Home Affairs sought proof of the party's existence along with 13 other political parties due to its failure to comply with the Foreign Interference (Countermeasures) Act 2021. If there is no proof of existence provided to the Singapore Government within 3 months, the Registrar of Societies will deem the party as officially defunct.

The party was officially deregistered on 4 December 2025.
