= S. R. Nathan =

President of Singapore from 1999 to 2011

S. R. Nathan DUT PJG GCB
- செல்லப்பன் ராமநாதன்
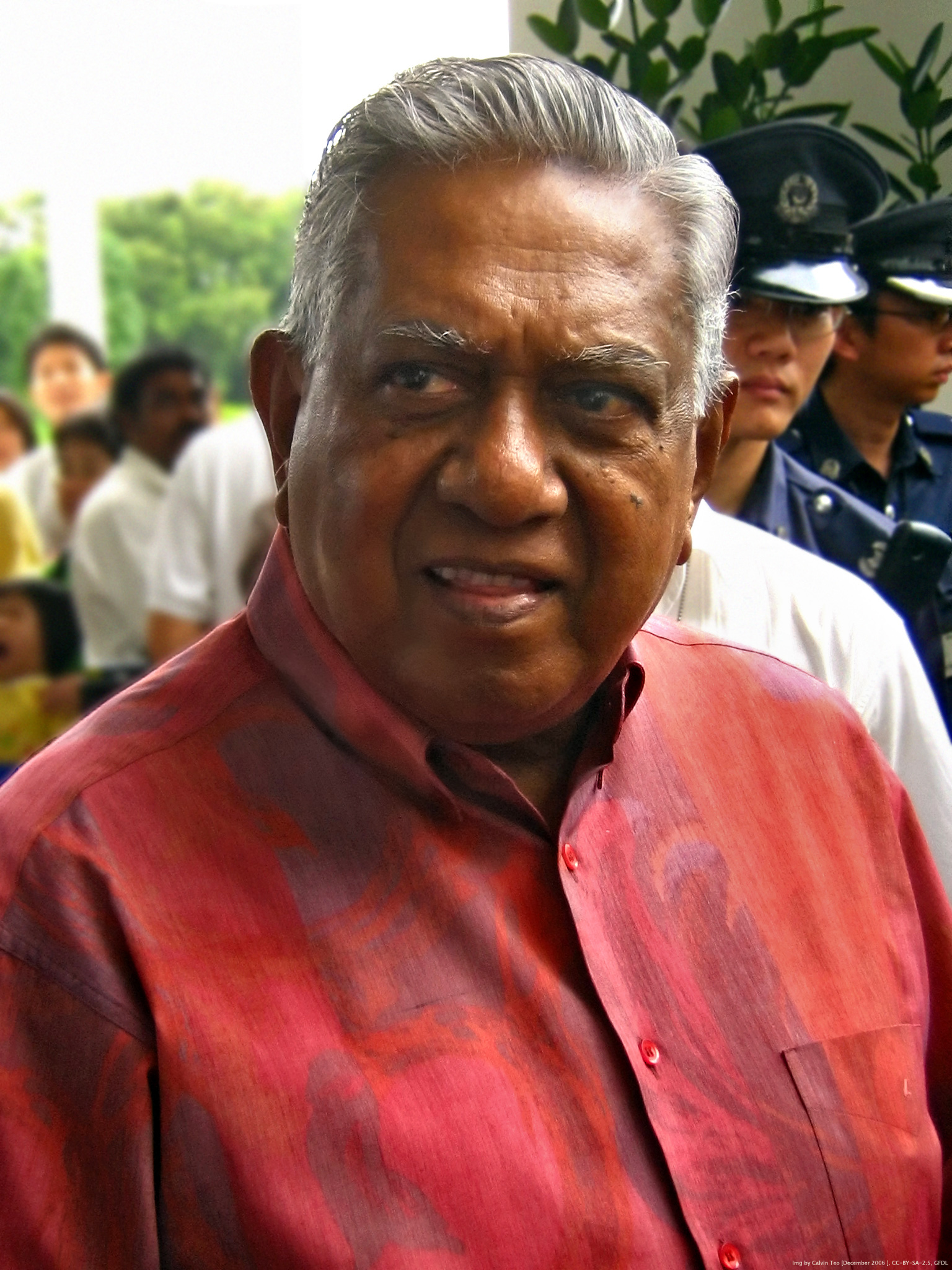
- Nathan in 2006

6th President of Singapore
- In office 1 September 1999 – 1 September 2011
- Prime Minister: Goh Chok Tong; Lee Hsien Loong
- Preceded by: Ong Teng Cheong
- Succeeded by: Tony Tan

Singapore Ambassador to the United States
- In office 20 September 1990 – June 1996
- President: Wee Kim Wee; Ong Teng Cheong
- Preceded by: Tommy Koh
- Succeeded by: Chan Heng Chee

Singapore High Commissioner to Malaysia
- In office April 1988 – July 1990
- President: Wee Kim Wee

Director of the Security and Intelligence Division
- In office August 1971 – February 1979
- Prime Minister: Lee Kuan Yew
- Preceded by: Tan Boon Seng
- Succeeded by: Eddie Teo

Personal details
- Born: Sellapan Ramanathan; 3 July 1924 Singapore, Straits Settlements
- Died: 22 August 2016 (aged 92) Singapore
- Cause of death: Stroke
- Resting place: Mandai Crematorium and Columbarium
- Party: Independent (1999–2016)
- Spouse: Urmila Nandey
- Children: 2
- Education: University of Malaya
- Occupation: Politician; diplomat; civil servant

Sellapan Ramanathan DUT PJG (Tamil: செல்லப்பன் ராமநாதன், IPA: /ˈsɛləpən rɑːməˈnɑːðən/; 3 July 1924 – 22 August 2016), often known as S. R. Nathan, was a Singaporean civil servant, diplomat and politician who served as the sixth president of Singapore between 1999 and 2011. He was the longest-serving president in the country's history, holding office for two full terms. Prior to his presidency, Nathan held various key positions in the public service, including roles in the Ministry of Foreign Affairs, the Ministry of Home Affairs and the Security and Intelligence Division (SID). He also served as Singapore's High Commissioner to Malaysia and Ambassador to the United States.

Nathan was born in Singapore when it was a part of the Straits Settlements. He faced financial difficulties during his childhood, particularly after the death of his father. He left school during his teenage years and worked various jobs during the Japanese occupation of Singapore in World War II, including as a translator. After the war, he resumed his education and graduated with a Diploma in Social Studies from the University of Malaya's Singapore division in 1954. He began his civil service career in the Labour Ministry in 1955 and later moved to the Foreign Ministry.

In the course of his civil service career, Nathan held several senior appointments, including Director of the SID and Permanent Secretary of the Ministry of Foreign Affairs. In 1974, during the Laju incident, he volunteered to accompany members of the Japanese Red Army and Popular Front for the Liberation of Palestine out of Singapore to ensure the safe release of civilian hostages, a move that drew national and international attention. He later served as Executive Chairman of The Straits Times Press from 1982 to 1988, High Commissioner to Malaysia from 1988 to 1990 and Ambassador to the United States from 1990 to 1996.

Nathan was elected President of Singapore in 1999 and re-elected in 2005, both times unopposed after other prospective candidates were deemed ineligible. His presidency, largely ceremonial in accordance with the Constitution, was marked by public engagement and support for charitable causes, including the launch of the President's Challenge in 2000. Following his retirement in 2011, he continued to contribute to public life through writing and advisory roles. He died in 2016 at the age of 92 and was accorded a state funeral.

== Early life and education ==
Nathan, who was of Tamil descent, was born in Singapore on 3 July 1924. He spent his childhood with his parents, V. Sellapan and Abirami, and two older brothers in Muar, Johor, in a house overlooking the Strait of Malacca. Nathan would eventually be one of seven siblings; his three older brothers died in childhood. His father had been posted to the Malayan town as a lawyer's clerk for a firm that serviced rubber plantations, but the Great Depression and rubber slump of the 1930s sent the family's fortunes crashing. Nathan's father accrued debts and eventually committed suicide when Nathan was eight.

Returning to Singapore, Nathan received his primary education at Anglo-Chinese Primary School and Rangoon Road Morning School, and his secondary education at Victoria School. However, Nathan was often truant in school and was eventually expelled from school twice and, after quarrelling with his mother, ran away from home at the age of 16. During the Japanese occupation of Singapore, Nathan learned Japanese and worked for the Japanese civilian police as a translator. After the war, whilst working, he completed his secondary education through a correspondence course with Wolsey Hall, Oxford, and entered the University of Malaya (then in Singapore), where he became the secretary of the University Socialist Club in his second year of university.

He graduated in 1954 with a Diploma in Social Studies (Distinction). He earned a diploma from the University of Malaya in Singapore in 1954. This was followed by a long career in the Singapore Civil Service, which he joined in 1955. Between 1962 and 1966 he was seconded to the National Trades Union Congress, and then worked in the Ministry of Foreign Affairs and Ministry of Home Affairs. He was with the Security and Intelligence Division of the Defence Ministry when the Laju incident happened in 1974, and was among the government officers who agreed to accompany terrorists who had bombed petroleum tanks to Kuwait to secure the release of civilian hostages and ensure the terrorists' safe passage. He served as First Permanent Secretary of the Foreign Ministry from 1979 to 1982.

Nathan left the Civil Service in 1982 to take up the executive chairmanship of the Straits Times Press; he also held directorships in other companies. Between 1988 and 1996 he served as Singapore's High Commissioner to Malaysia and Ambassador to the United States, before his 12-year term as President of the Republic from 1999 to 2011. Following retirement, Nathan turned to writing and also became a Distinguished Senior Fellow at the School of Social Sciences of Singapore Management University (SMU), and at the Institute of Southeast Asian Studies. He died in 2016 and was accorded a state funeral by the Government.

Among the awards and honours Nathan received were the renaming of Singapore University of Social Sciences (SUSS) School of Human Development and Social Services to S R Nathan School of Human Development (NSHD) in 2018, Bintang Bakti Masyarakat (Public Service Star) in 1964, the Pingat Pentadbiran Awam (Perak) (Public Administration Medal, Silver) in 1967, the Pingat Pentadbiran Awam (Meritorious Service Medal) in 1975, and the Darjah Utama Temasek (Order of Temasek) (First Class) in 2013; and honorary degrees from the National University of Singapore and SMU.

== Civil Service career ==
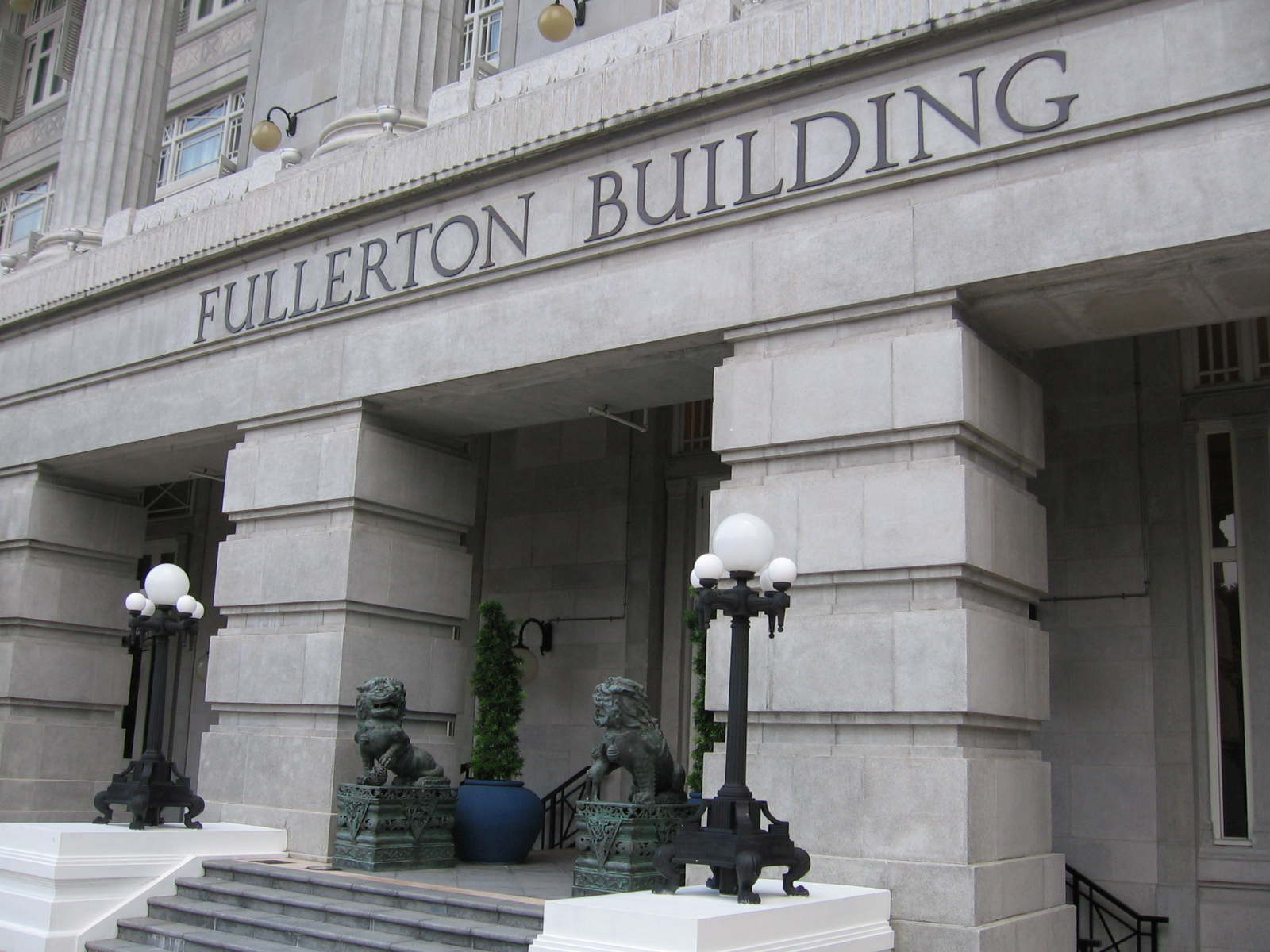
The Fullerton Hotel Singapore, formerly Fullerton Building. Nathan worked in the building in the 1950s as the Seamen's Welfare Officer with the Marine Department. In recognition of this, during his state funeral procession his cortège passed by the building.

Nathan began his career in the Singapore Civil Service as a medical social worker in 1955. He was appointed Seamen's Welfare Officer the following year. In 1962, he was seconded to the Labour Research Unit of the National Trades Union Congress (NTUC), first as assistant director and later as director of the Labour Research Unit until January 1966. Nathan negotiated Singapore's membership of the Afro-Asian People's Solidarity Organisation. He later served as a member of the NTUC's Board of Trustees from 1983 to April 1988.

In February 1966, Nathan was transferred to the Ministry of Foreign Affairs. He served as Assistant Secretary and rose to be Deputy Secretary before being appointed Deputy Secretary of the Ministry of Home Affairs in January 1971. On 6 August of the same year, Nathan moved to the Ministry of Defence where he was Director of the Security and Intelligence Division (SID). In the Laju incident on 31 January 1974, members of the terrorist Japanese Red Army and the Popular Front for the Liberation of Palestine bombed petroleum tanks on Pulau Bukom off the coast of Singapore; Nathan was among a group of government officers who volunteered to be held hostage by the JRA and flown to Kuwait to secure the release of civilian hostages and ensure the terrorists' safe passage. For his bravery, in August 1974 he was awarded the Pingat Jasa Gemilang (Meritorious Service Medal).

In February 1979, Nathan returned to the Foreign Ministry and became its First Permanent Secretary until February 1982, when he left to become the Executive Chairman of the newspaper company the Straits Times Press. The appointment was viewed dimly by journalists who felt that the Government was trying to limit freedom of the press; they wore black armbands in protest. According to Nathan in a 2010 interview, " When they saw I was not doing what they expected me to do, they began to have confidence." At various times between 1982 and 1988, Nathan also held directorships of several other companies, including the Singapore Mint, The Straits Times Press (London), Singapore Press Holdings and Marshall Cavendish. He held a directorship in the Singapore International Media between September 1996 and August 1999. He was Chairman of Mitsubishi Heavy Industries Singapore, a ship-repairing and engineering joint venture with the Mitsubishi Group of Japan, from 1973 to 1986. From 1983 to April 1988, Nathan was Chairman of the Hindu Endowments Board. He was a founding member of the Singapore Indian Development Association (SINDA), and its term trustee until August 1999.

In April 1988, Nathan was appointed Singapore's High Commissioner to Malaysia, and in July 1990 he became Ambassador to the United States, serving until June 1996. On his return, Nathan was made an Ambassador-at-Large and was concurrently Director of the Institute of Defence and Strategic Studies at the Nanyang Technological University. He resigned as ambassador and director of the institute on 17 August 1999 to become an independent candidate in the 1999 Singapore presidential election.

== Presidency (1999–2011) ==
During the 1999 presidential election, as two other prospective candidates were found to be constitutionally ineligible, Nathan was elected unopposed as president on 18 August 1999 and was ex officio appointed Chancellor of the National University of Singapore and the Nanyang Technological University.

His candidacy was supported by Senior Minister Lee Kuan Yew and former President Wee Kim Wee. Nathan succeeded Ong Teng Cheong as the president of Singapore, and was sworn in on 1 September 1999.

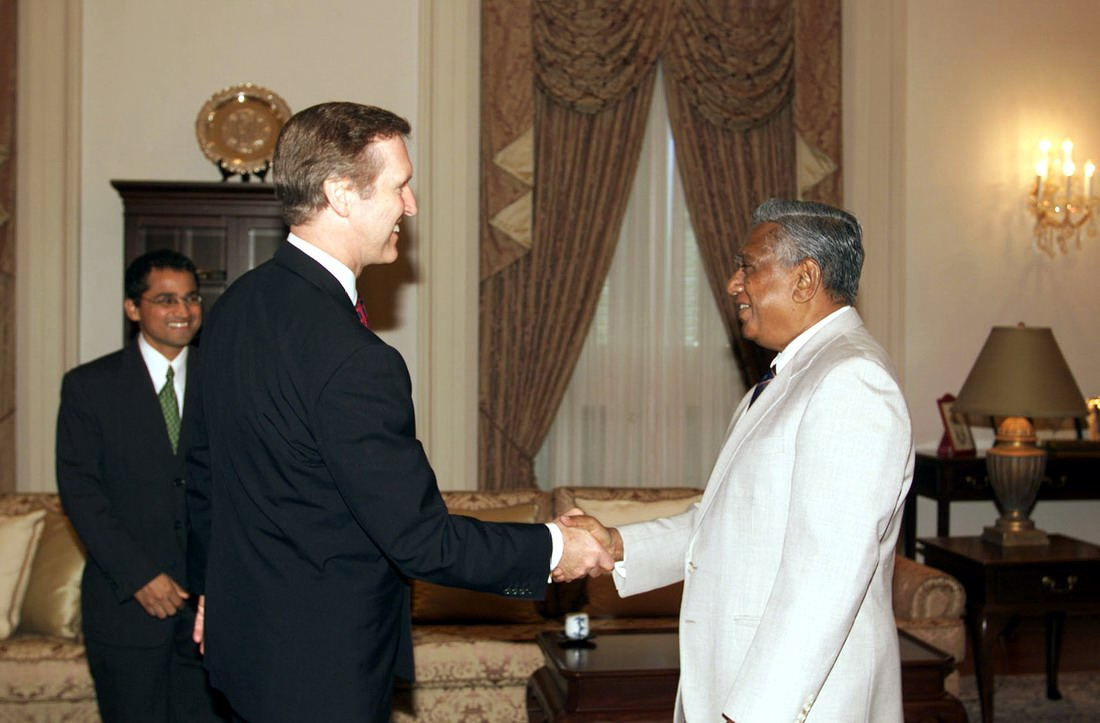
S. R. Nathan receiving the United States Secretary of Defense William Cohen at the Istana during the latter's visit to Singapore

Nathan launched the annual President's Challenge charity fundraising initiative in 2000. Continued in 2012 by his successor, President Tony Tan, and as of 2016 about S$160 million had been raised by the movement.

During the 2005 presidential election, the Presidential Elections Committee (PEC) declared Nathan as the only eligible candidate on 13 August, rejecting three other applications based on constitutional criteria. Thus, Nathan was elected unopposed for a second term on 17 August 2005. He was sworn in for a second term of office on 1 September 2005, and as of 2016, is the only person who has served two terms as president.

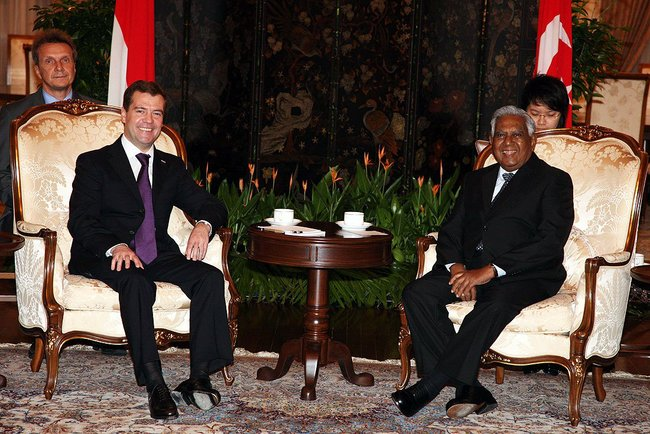
Nathan with Russian President Dmitry Medvedev, 15 November 2009

On 21 January 2009, Nathan approved in principle the Government's request to draw $4.9 billion from the nation's past financial reserves to fund the Government's Resilience Package consisting of two schemes aimed at preserving jobs and businesses during the Great Recession: the Jobs Credit scheme, which provided employers with financial assistance to pay employees' salaries; and the Special Risk-Sharing Initiative, which helped mid-sized companies to obtain credit. This was the first time the President's discretionary powers had been exercised for this purpose. The President's formal approval of the drawdown was subsequently signified in two notifications dated 13 March 2009.

== Post–presidency (2011–2016) ==
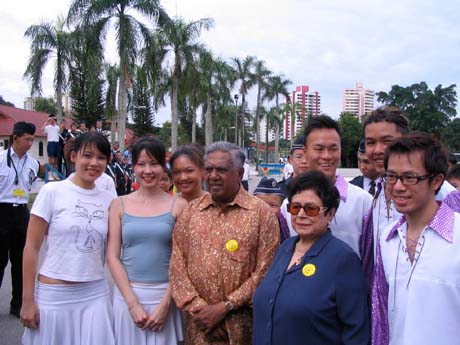
President Nathan and his wife Urmila Nandey at the BBCares Carnival organised by the Boys' Brigade in Singapore in July 2005

On 1 July 2011, Nathan announced that he would not be seeking a third term in office as president. He cited his age as one of the reasons, as he did not believe he could undertake indefinitely the heavy responsibilities and physical demands of the position of head of state at 87. He left office on 1 September that same year and was succeeded by Tony Tan. A few weeks later, on 19 September, his book An Unexpected Journey: Path to the Presidency was launched by Prime Minister Lee Hsien Loong. At the same time, the S. R. Nathan Educational Upliftment Fund was inaugurated to provide bursaries, scholarships and other forms of financial assistance to needy Institute of Technical Education, polytechnic and university students.

As President, Nathan was the patron of Singapore Management University from 2000 to 2011, and after completing his term of office he became a Distinguished Senior Fellow of the SMU School of Social Sciences. Additionally, he was also a patron of the Singapore University of Social Sciences from 2006 to 2011. He held a similar position at the Institute of Southeast Asian Studies. He was also the first patron of the Inter-Religious Organisation from 2012 till his death in 2016.

== Personal life ==
On 15 December 1958, Nathan married Urmila Nandey (born 1929) and had one son and one daughter.

== Illness and death ==
Nathan suffered a stroke on the morning of 31 July 2016 and was taken to Singapore General Hospital's Intensive Care Unit. He died in hospital on 22 August that year at 9:48 pm SST, aged 92. He was survived by his wife Urmila Nandey (known as Umi), their daughter Juthika and son Osith, three grandchildren, and his sister Sundari.

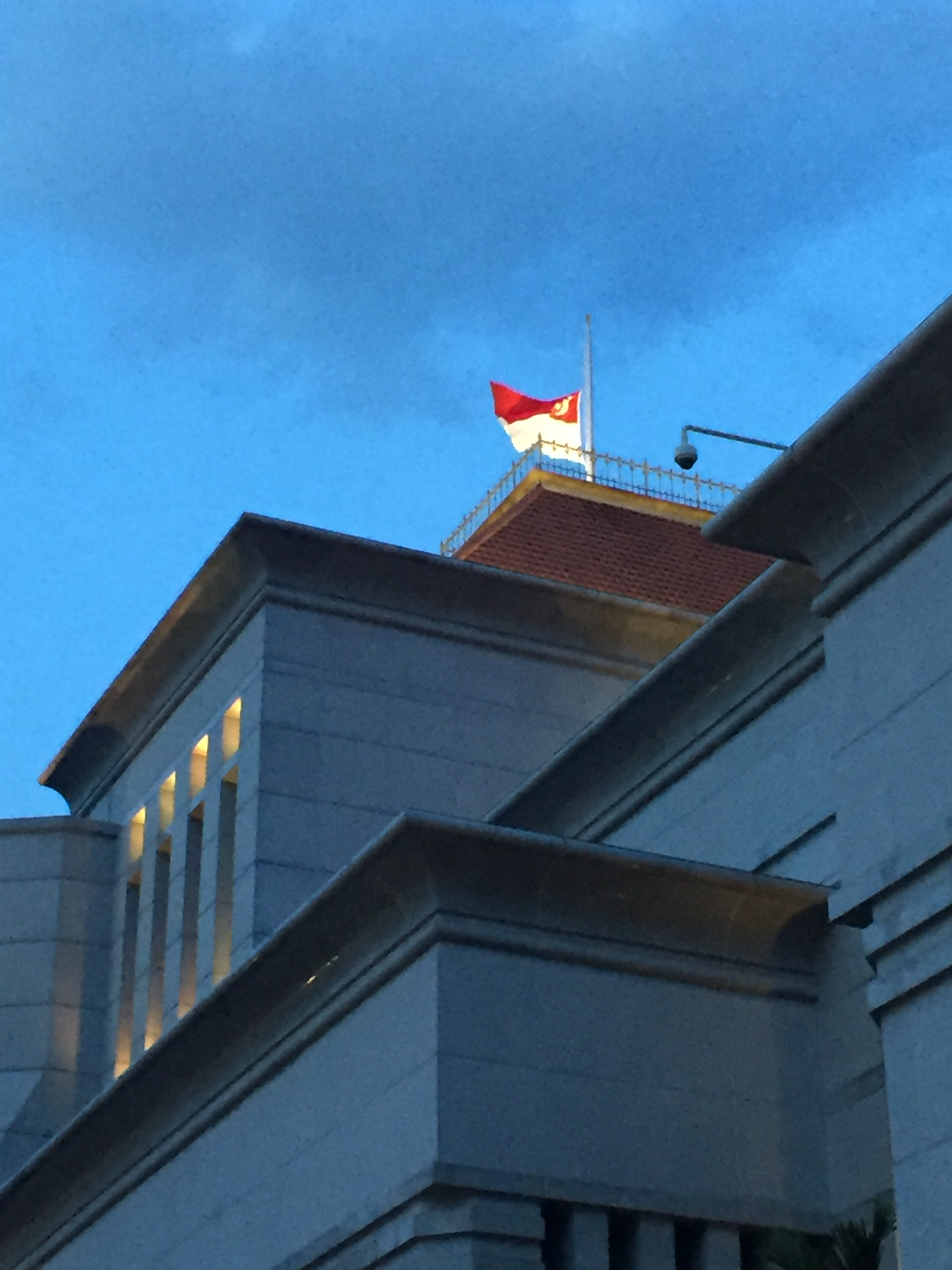
The National Flag flying at half-mast at Parliament House as Nathan lay in state there on 25 August 2016

As a mark of respect, the Government directed that the National Flag would fly at half-mast from all government buildings from 23 to 26 August. Nathan's body lay in state at Parliament House on 25 August to enable members of the public to pay their respects.

On 26 August, a state funeral was held to honour Nathan. His body was conveyed by a ceremonial 25-pounder gun carriage from Parliament House to the University Cultural Centre of the National University of Singapore (NUS). The state funeral procession passed by landmarks of significance to his life, including City Hall, where he had attended three National Day Parades; The Fullerton Hotel Singapore, formerly the Fullerton Building which had housed the Marine Department where he had worked; and NTUC Centre, recalling Nathan's time in the labour movement. Speakers who delivered eulogies at the state funeral included Prime Minister Lee Hsien Loong and Ambassadors-at-Large Tommy Koh and Gopinath Pillai. The music played at the ceremony included the song "Thanjavooru Mannu Eduthu" ("Taking the Sands of Thanjavur") from the Tamil film Porkkaalam (Golden Age, 1997), about a dollmaker who moulds a doll of a beautiful lady with sand, clay and water from different lands, and eventually gives life to the doll. It was Nathan's favourite song as he saw it as a metaphor for Singapore's multiracial heritage.

The state funeral was followed by a private cremation at Mandai Crematorium.

== Legacy ==
In 2018, the Singapore University of Social Sciences (SUSS) School of Human Development and Social Services was renamed the S R Nathan School of Human Development (NSHD) in honor of Nathan to recognise his advocacy of social and community causes when he was patron of SUSS.

== Honours ==
In addition to the Pingat Jasa Gemilang (Meritorious Service Medal) he was awarded in 1975 for his actions during the Laju incident, Nathan was conferred the Bintang Bakti Masyarakat (Public Service Star) in 1964 and the Pingat Pentadbiran Awam (Perak) (Public Administration Medal, Silver) in 1967. On 8 August 2013, Nathan was conferred the Darjah Utama Temasek (Order of Temasek) (First Class). On 2006 he was conferred with Order of the Bath.

Nathan, who had been chancellor of NUS from 1999 to 2011 during his presidency, was conferred an Eminent Alumni award by the university in 2007, and an honorary Doctor of Letters (D.Litt.) on 5 July 2012. SMU also conferred on him an honorary D.Litt. on 14 July 2014. In 2015, the Faculty of Arts and Social Sciences of NUS gave him its Distinguished Arts and Social Sciences Alumni Award for lifetime achievement.

Nathan was the Singapore Scout Association's Chief Scout when he was president. He received the Asia-Pacific Regional Distinguished Scout Award in 2005, and the Association's Distinguished Service Award (Gold) in 2010.

Nathan's achievements were also recognised abroad. During a state visit to Bahrain on 22 November 2010 he was given the Al-Khalifa Order, and while on a state visit to Mauritius in June 2011 he was conferred an honorary Doctor of Civil Law (D.C.L.) degree by the University of Mauritius for his contributions to education and culture. In 2012, the Government of India conferred the Pravasi Bharatiya Samman (Overseas Indian Award) to Nathan in recognition of his contribution in building closer links between Singapore and India.

=== National ===
- Singapore:
  - First class of the Order of Temasek (DUT) - 2013
  - Meritorious Service Medal (PJG) - 1974
  - Silver of the Public Administration Medal - 1967
  - Public Service Star - 1964

=== Foreign honours ===
- Bahrain:
  - Collar of the Order of al-Khalifa - 2010
- India:
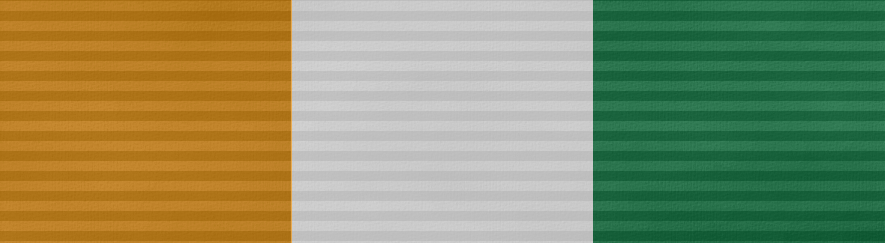
  - Pravasi Bharatiya Samman - 2010
- United Kingdom:
  - Honorary Knight Grand Cross of the Order of the Bath (GCB) - 2006

== Publications ==
- Nathan, S. R. (2008), Singapore's Foreign Policy: Beginnings and Future, Singapore: MFA Diplomatic Academy, ISBN 978-981-0808-34-1.
- Nathan, S. R. (2010), Tan, Bernard T. G.; Wee, Seo Lay (eds.), Why Am I Here?: Overcoming Hardships of Local Seafarers, Singapore: Centre for Maritime Studies, National University of Singapore, ISBN 978-981-0850-91-3.
- Nathan, S. R.; Auger, Timothy (2011), An Unexpected Journey: Path to the Presidency, Singapore: Editions Didier Millet, ISBN 978-981-4260-73-2.
- Nathan, S. R. (2011), Winning against the Odds: The Labour Research Unit in NTUC's Founding, Singapore: Straits Times Press, ISBN 978-981-4266-87-1.
- Nathan, S. R. (2013), The Crane and the Crab, Singapore: Epigram Books, ISBN 978-981-0735-90-6.
- Nathan, S. R.; Auger, Timothy (2013), S. R. Nathan: 50 Stories from My Life, Singapore: Editions Didier Millet, ISBN 978-981-4385-34-3.
- Nathan, S. R.; Auger, Timothy (2015), S. R. Nathan in Conversation with Timothy Auger, Singapore: Editions Didier Millet, ISBN 978-981-4610-03-2.

Political offices
Preceded by Ong Teng Cheong	President of Singapore; 1999–2011	Succeeded by Tony Tan Keng Yam
Party political offices
Preceded by Ong Teng Cheong	Nonpartisan nominee for President of Singapore; 1999 (no ballot); 2005 (no ballot)	Succeeded by Tony Tan Keng Yam
