= Institute for Defence and Strategic Studies =

Think tank based in Singapore

The Institute Of Defence and Strategic Studies (IDSS) is an institute within the S. Rajaratnam School of International Studies (RSIS), Singapore.

It was established in July 1996 as an autonomous research institute within the Nanyang Technological University. Its stated objectives are to conduct research and provide general and graduate education in the area of national security, military technology and international relations. It also promotes joint and exchange programmes with similar regional and international institutions; and organise seminars and conferences on these topics.

Constituents of IDSS include the International Centre for Political Violence and Terrorism Research (ICPVTR), the Centre of Excellence for National Security (CENS) and the Asian Programme for Negotiation and Conflict Management (APNCM).

On 1 January 2007, the S. Rajaratnam School of International Studies was formed, and IDSS became an institute within the school, focussing on security research. The teaching functions were taken over by RSIS.
