= Westbourne Mansion =

Historic conserved mansion in Singapore

Coordinates: 1°19′00″N 103°50′18″E

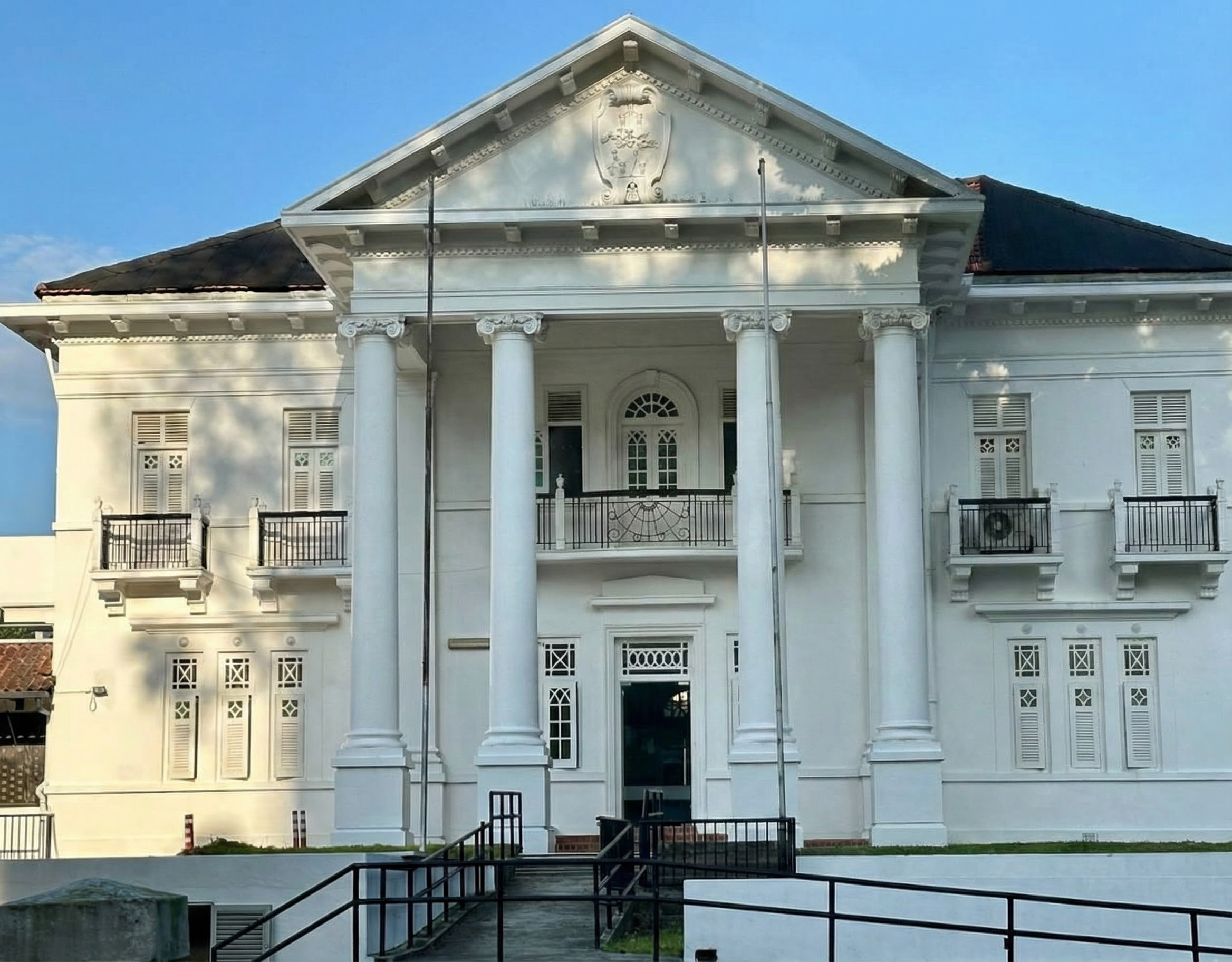
- Interactive map of the Westbourne Mansion area
- Former names: Field House

General information
- Type: Mansion
- Architectural style: Neo-Classical
- Location: 25 Gilstead Road, Novena, Singapore
- Completed: 1927
- Client: Dr. Yin Suat Chuan (S. C. Yin)

Design and construction
- Architects: Chung Hong Woot (Chung and Wong)

Westbourne Mansion, also known formerly as Field House, is a historic, conserved mansion located at 25 Gilstead Road in Novena, Singapore. Built in 1927, it was originally the residence of physician and civic figure Dr. Yin Suat Chuan. The mansion was the family home of his son, Leslie Charteris, the author known for creating "The Saint".

The building has a history of adaptive reuse. During World War II, it was reportedly occupied by the German Kriegsmarine. From 1957 to 2003, it served as the headquarters for the Spastic Children's Association of Singapore (now Cerebral Palsy Alliance Singapore) under the name Field House. The building is currently a state property managed by the Singapore Land Authority.

== History ==
=== Construction and early residents (1927–c. 1940s) ===
The mansion at 25 Gilstead Road was constructed in 1927 in the Gilstead Road neighbourhood, an area developed in the early 20th century as a residential district for professionals.

The house was commissioned by Dr. Yin Suat Chuan (S. C. Yin, 1876–1958). A Western-educated physician, Dr. Yin was involved in civic and commercial activities, including co-founding the Anti-Opium Society and the Oversea-Chinese Bank Ltd (a precursor to OCBC Bank), and serving as a municipal commissioner and a Justice of the Peace.

He named the residence "Westbourne," an English name reflecting the cosmopolitan orientation of the Straits Chinese community of the era. His son, Leslie Charles Bowyer-Yin, who lived in the home, later became internationally known under the pen name Leslie Charteris as the author of The Saint series.

Following the Yin family, the residence was occupied by Dr. J.S. Webster, a radiologist at the General Hospital (now Singapore General Hospital) who established the St John's Ambulance division in Singapore.

=== World War II (c. 1940s) ===
During the Japanese occupation of Singapore, Westbourne was reportedly forcibly occupied to serve as the Stützpunkt-Office (Headquarters) for the Kriegsmarine, the navy of Nazi Germany. The Kriegsmarine operated alongside Japanese forces in the region, including the Monsun Gruppe U-boats such as the U-181.

=== Field House (1957–2003) ===
In 1957, the property was leased by the Spastic Children's Association of Singapore from the Singapore government to serve as its headquarters. The mansion was renamed "Field House" in honour of Professor Elaine Field, a paediatrician involved in forming the Association.

For nearly half a century, Field House served as the association's headquarters, school, and treatment centre, providing specialized care and education for children with cerebral palsy. Building plans from the era indicate architectural adaptations were made for its institutional use, supporting physiotherapy and mobility exercises.

The building and its grounds hosted community events and visits by public figures. First Lady Mrs Benjamin Henry Sheares attended the association's annual sports meets at the premises, including the 13th annual meet where she observed a water ballet demonstration, and the 15th annual meet.

Later, First Lady Mrs Wee Kim Wee (Koh Sok Hiong), wife of President Wee Kim Wee, also attended the association's annual school sports at Field House.

The association (later renamed the Cerebral Palsy Alliance Singapore) relocated to new purpose-built premises in 2003.

=== Later uses and current status (2003–Present) ===
After the association's relocation in 2003, the state-owned property was adapted for use in early childhood education. It was first tenanted by Gracefields Kindergarten, and subsequently occupied by St. James' Church Kindergarten.

In 2025, the Singapore Land Authority (SLA) launched a tender for the building's adaptive reuse. In October 2025, the SLA announced the tender had been awarded to Singapore Kong Hong Lancre Pte Ltd. The proposal involves repurposing the mansion into a co-living residence, with interior design concepts and furnishings provided by the Japanese lifestyle brand MUJI. Plans include amenities such as co-working spaces and the establishment of a heritage gallery within the mansion to document its history, aiming to blend modern living with the building's architectural heritage.

== Architecture ==
Westbourne Mansion is a two-storey structure designed in a Neo-Classical style. It was designed by the architect Chung Hong Woot of the firm Chung and Wong. The facade features classical elements, including an Ionic colonnade supporting a porte-cochère (covered porch) and a triangular pediment above the entrance. The building exhibits a symmetrical design with balconies featuring wrought iron balustrades.

The building is documented in Lee Kip Lin's architectural survey The Singapore House 1819–1942. While the property is recognized for its heritage value, it is not currently a gazetted conservation building. It stands as a historical structure in the Gilstead Road area, which has otherwise been extensively redeveloped with modern high-rise condominiums.
