= Wee Kim Wee =

President of Singapore from 1985 to 1993

Wee Kim Wee PBM BBM DUT
- 黃金輝
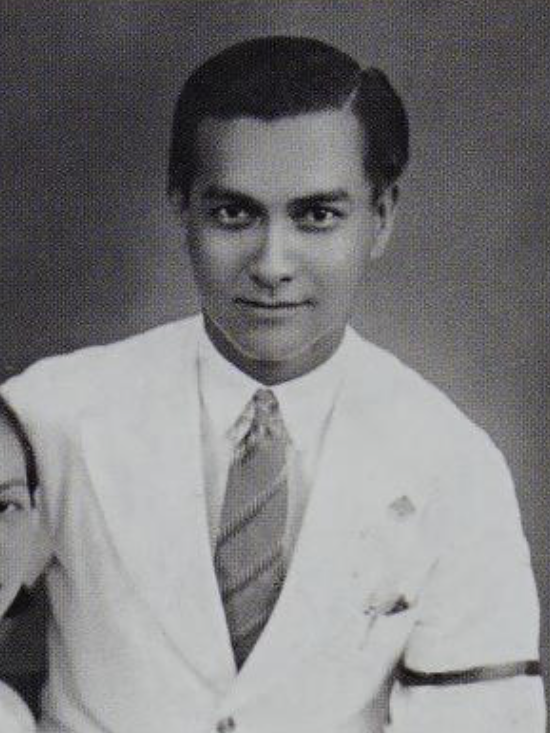
- Wee in 1936

4th President of Singapore
- In office 2 September 1985 – 1 September 1993
- Prime Minister: Lee Kuan Yew; Goh Chok Tong
- Preceded by: Devan Nair; Wee Chong Jin (acting); Yeoh Ghim Seng (acting)
- Succeeded by: Ong Teng Cheong

Singapore Ambassador to South Korea
- In office September 1980 – April 1984
- President: Benjamin Sheares; Devan Nair
- Preceded by: Wee Mon Cheng
- Succeeded by: Lee Khoon Choy

Singapore Ambassador to Japan
- In office September 1980 – April 1984
- President: Benjamin Sheares; Devan Nair
- Preceded by: Wee Mon Cheng
- Succeeded by: Lee Khoon Choy

Singapore High Commissioner to Malaysia
- In office 15 September 1973 – 31 August 1980
- President: Benjamin Sheares
- Preceded by: Chiang Hai Ding
- Succeeded by: Maurice Baker

Personal details
- Born: 4 November 1915 Singapore, Straits Settlements
- Died: 2 May 2005 (aged 89) Siglap Plain, Singapore
- Resting place: Mandai Crematorium and Columbarium
- Party: Independent
- Spouse: Koh Sok Hiong (m. 1936)
- Children: 7
- Education: Outram Secondary School; Raffles Institution
- Occupation: Journalist; diplomat

Wee Kim Wee (Note: Chinese: 黄金辉; Pe̍h-ōe-jī: Ûiⁿ Kim-hui; pinyin: Huáng Jīnhuī) (4 November 1915 – 2 May 2005) was a Singaporean journalist, diplomat and politician who served as the fourth president of Singapore between 1985 and 1993.

Born in Singapore during colonial rule, Wee was educated at Outram Secondary School and Raffles Institution, dropping out to work at The Straits Times in 1930. He left The Straits Times to join the United Press Associations in 1941, working there through the Second World War and eventually becoming the office manager and chief correspondent by 1959. That same year, he returned to The Straits Times after being offered the position of Deputy Editor.

During his time with them, he was best known for his interview of Lieutenant General Suharto, where he reported his intentions for peace during the Indonesia–Malaysia confrontation. He also became the first Singaporean journalist to enter Jakarta when he went to interview Suharto. He retired from journalism in 1973 at the position of editorial manager and became a diplomat, serving as Singapore's High Commissioner to Malaysia from 1973 and 1980 and Ambassador to Japan and South Korea concurrently from 1980 and 1984, on the request of Foreign Minister S. Rajaratnam.

In 1985, Wee was elected president by Parliament and served in the role for two terms, ending in 1993. For the ensuing presidential election in 1993, the first in Singapore to be decided by popular vote, Wee decided not to contest and retired after his second term had ended. During his presidency, he was known for improving relations between Singapore with Israel, Malaysia, and China, along with attending or officiating many events. He was also the first president to exercise custodial powers pursuant to the constitutional amendments in Singapore's history. He was succeeded by Ong Teng Cheong as president and went into retirement. Wee released an autobiography in 2004, and died of prostate cancer the following year in his home at Siglap Plain on 2 May 2005, at the age of 89.

== Early life and education ==
Wee Kim Wee was born in Singapore, which was then under British rule and a part of the Straits Settlements, at the Free Middleton Hospital on 4 November 1915. The youngest of four sons to Wee Choong Lay and Chua Hay Luan, his father Choong Lay worked on a ship, being in charge of the cargo. His father later went blind after an unsuccessful surgery, causing his family to move from their home in Zion Road to a house at Holland Road. The house, which lacked electricity or piped water, was owned by a wealthy landowner whom they paid a rent of S$3.00 a month. Wee's family relied on rearing poultry and fruits growing around the house for money.

In 1923, Wee attended Pearl's Hill School for his primary education. He later attended Outram Secondary School, before enrolling in Raffles Institution, for his secondary education. He passed his Standard VII in 1929, being promoted to a "Junior" class. He dropped out of school sometime after 1929 after his mother urged him to find employment, seeing as how their family was still struggling financially, living in Singapore Harbour Board housing at Kampong Bahru. His uncle Tan Kok Tiong, who worked as a chief clerk at Singaporean newspaper The Straits Times, recommended that Wee work at the circulation department of the newspaper.

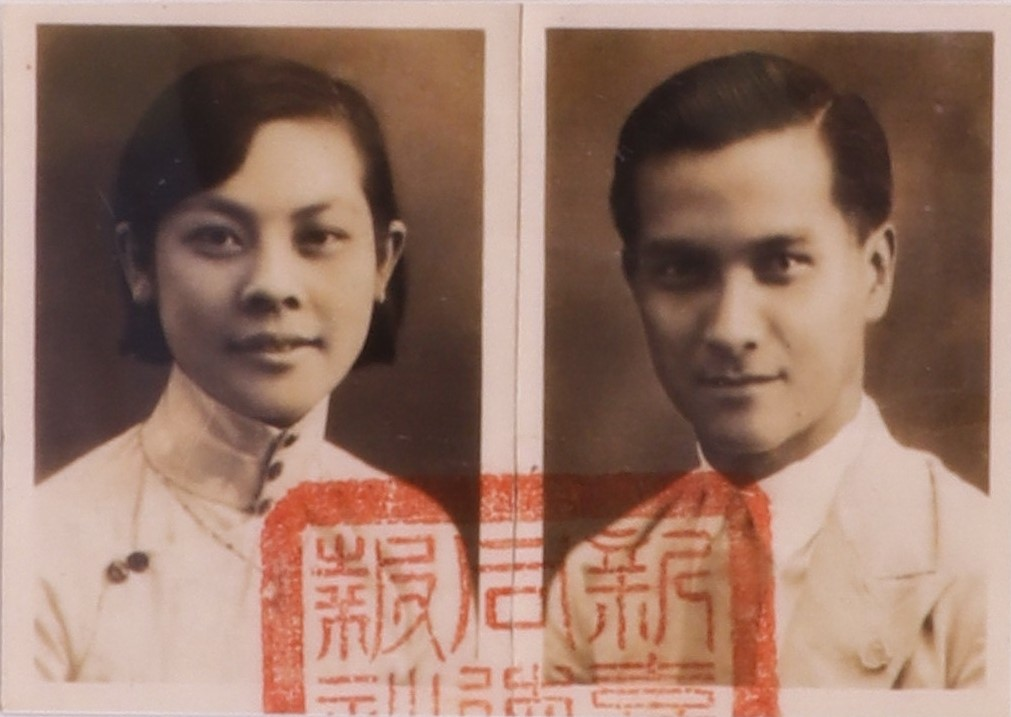
Koh Sok Hiong and Wee's marriage photos, c. 1936

He married Koh Sok Hiong in 1936 in an arranged marriage between their families; she was eighteen years old. They had their wedding conducted at the United Chinese Library in Mandarin, which he later stated in his 2004 memoirs that he did not understand. He was one of three suitors whom Koh's family chose from, and Wee considered himself to be the most unlikely due to his limited education and wealth. Wee did happen to be good friends with Koh's brother, Koh Kim Swan, who backed him and subsequently got Koh's grandmother to agree to picking him, allowing Wee to eventually marry Koh.

During his youth, Wee enjoyed playing badminton. He founded the Useful Badminton Party in 1932 alongside thirteen other badminton players, whom he met while living at his Singapore Harbour Board housing. In 1937, he won the singles title in the Singapore Junior championship. In 1938, he was elected to the Singapore Badminton Association's management committee, initially serving as its secretary before eventually becoming the president. He retired from competitive badminton the following year due to medical reasons.

== Career ==
=== Journalism (1930–1973) ===
In 1930, Wee started working for the newspaper The Straits Times in its circulation department. He worked in the circulation department for five years before being transferred to the advertising department, which he worked at for about three to four years before becoming a reporter. Initially, Wee covered sporting events such as soccer, badminton, table tennis, and basketball, which were usually at the stadiums or the amusement parks.

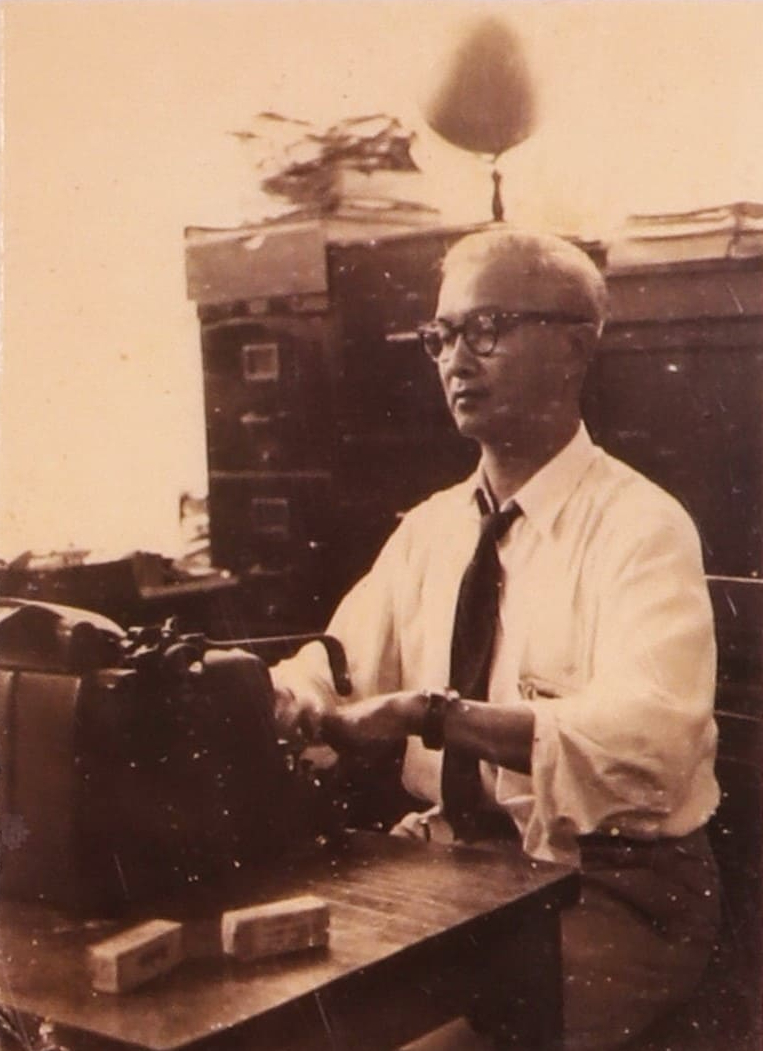
Wee in 1954, working for the United Press Associations (UPA)

Early in 1941, he resigned from The Straits Times to join American news agency United Press Associations (UPA) after the post of circulation chief clerk was not offered to him upon its vacancy at The Straits Times. During the Second World War, while working at UPA, he served in the Air Raid Precautions. He struggled financially during the war, setting up a stall in Kampong Bahru where he sold things such as mosquito coils. During the Japanese occupation, he worked clerical jobs at various Japanese military establishments. After the end of the war, Wee continued to struggle financially. Following the liberation of Singapore, UPA correspondent Charles McQuown-Wright contacted him and gave him S$50.00 to support himself. As he continued to work at UPA, he eventually became the office manager and chief correspondent in the early 1950s. As chief correspondent, he reported to an American manager about Singapore, Malaya, Borneo, and Brunei.

In 1959, Wee was asked to return to The Straits Times where he would be appointed as Deputy Editor, the head of The Straits Times' editorial department, to which he accepted. In 1963, Wee managed to interview a Sulu pirate chief while he was in Malaysia. In 1966, he interviewed then-Lieutenant General Suharto and then-Indonesian Foreign Minister Adam Malik. He reported their intentions to end the confrontation between Indonesia and Malaysia, also known as the Konfrontasi. Wee had interviewed Malik earlier in Bangkok before gaining permission to interview Suharto in Jakarta. He was also the first Singaporean journalist to gain permission to enter Jakarta. In the early 1970s, Wee was responsible for helping form the Singapore Press Club. Suggesting the idea to T. S. Khoo, Wee set up and held the first inaugural meeting of the club after his agreement. Wee was also responsible for finding where the club's premises would be, first at the Summit Hotel (now known as the York Hotel) and later the Apollo Hotel, both at low rental rates. In 1970, he was appointed as editorial manager, which he worked as till 1973 when he left journalism.

=== Diplomacy (1973–1984) ===
In 1973, Wee was approached by then-Foreign Minister S. Rajaratnam to serve as Singapore's High Commissioner to Malaysia, which he accepted and subsequently left The Straits Times. Originally, he was only supposed to serve for three years but ended up serving seven years as the High Commissioner to Malaysia, ending on 31 August 1980. During his time there, he lived in Kuala Lumpur and was credited by Rajaratnam in helping improve the relationship between the two countries, especially after the separation of Singapore from Malaysia a few years prior.

In September 1980, Wee was appointed to serve concurrently as Singapore's Ambassador to Japan, having presented his credentials earlier in October, and Ambassador to South Korea. In 1981, Wee opened the Development Bank of Singapore's first Korean branch in Seoul. In 1983, he represented Singapore at the funeral for the victims of the Rangoon bombing. He retired from diplomacy in 1984.

=== Other appointments ===
During his career, Wee held multiple appointments on different statutory boards such as the Rent Control Board, Film Appeal Committee, Land Acquisition Board, Board of Visiting Justices, National Theatre Board, and the Singapore Broadcasting Corporation (present-day Mediacorp). He also served on the Council of the Singapore Anti-Tuberculosis Association (SATA) and later chairman of SATA. In 1959, Wee alongside fellow SATA Council member Sen Gupta introduced mobile x-ray machines to treat tuberculosis more efficiently in Singapore. Wee also served as a director for United Engineers, Wearne Brothers, and Banque Internationale à Luxembourg's Asia branch till 1985.

== Presidency (1985–1993) ==
=== 1985 presidential election ===
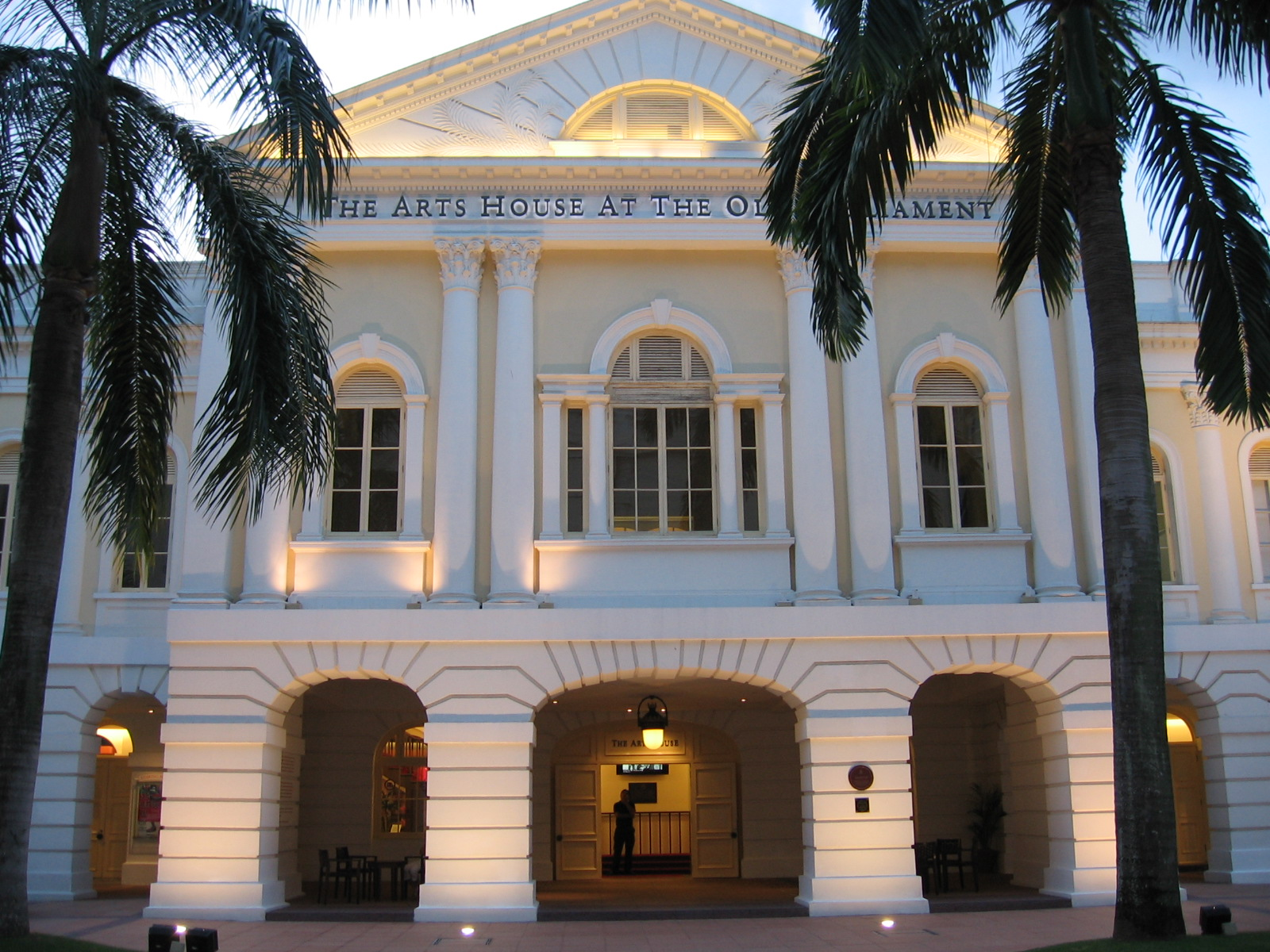
The Old Parliament House (pictured in 2006), where Wee was elected by Parliament at both presidential elections.

Following the resignation of incumbent president Devan Nair in March 1985, eight months before the end of his term, Parliament had to elect a new president. As presidents were elected by Parliament, not by popular vote, the presidential nominee had to gain a majority of the vote by Parliament to be elected. In August 1985, then-prime minister Lee Kuan Yew nominated Wee to become president at the 1985 presidential election after a five-month vacancy. Lee decided to choose Wee after being suggested him by Rajaratnam, who stated that Wee would be able to serve the presidency well after Nair's resignation. Other reasons for Wee's nomination was due to the government wanting a "non-political personality for the job". Wee received a unanimous agreement to his election, making him the first Chinese Singaporean to become president, and was sworn in on 2 September 1985. (Note: Before him was Malay Yusof Ishak, Eurasian Benjamin Sheares, and Indian Devan Nair.)

Member of Parliament for Kampong Kembangan Constituency Yatiman Yusof stated of Wee becoming the first president from a non-minority race of Singapore to have shown "a maturity of thought on the part of the multi-racial people of Singapore." Upon his inauguration, Wee received congratulations from Malaysian King Sultan Iskandar and Malaysian Queen Tengku Zanariah. He also received congratulations from Queen Elizabeth II, Pope John Paul II, Governor-General of Canada Jeanne Sauvé, and the presidents of India, Austria, Tanzania, Israel, and Cyprus.

=== First presidential term (1985–1989) ===
In September 1985, Wee held talks with King of Bahrain Isa bin Salman Al Khalifa during the latter's three day visit to Singapore at the Istana. He would do the same with Danish prime minister Poul Schlüter in October during his three-day visit. In November 1985, Wee gave his first speech at a public event, speaking after he opening the 24th Orient and Southeast Asian Lions Forum at the World Trade Centre (present-day HarbourFront Centre). Wee spoke about efforts made to support the less fortunate. Wee also prorogued the 6th Parliament to address concerns on Singapore's economy; the second session began in February. In February 1986, Wee invited Maltese president Agatha Barbara for a three-day visit and a state dinner in Singapore. He discussed improving the relationship and trade between the countries, stating that "Singapore Airlines's weekly flights to Malta have brought Singapore and Malta closer together," but that trade between them was "still relatively small." In March 1986, he visited the survivors of the Hotel New World collapse at Singapore General Hospital. In June 1986, he received the report of the Commission of Inquiry that was launched on Member of Parliament for Anson Constituency J. B. Jeyaretnam after allegations he made earlier that year.

In November 1986, Wee met Pope John Paul II when he visited Singapore for five hours. He also opened the 26th World Congress of the International Union Against Tuberculosis at Raffles City. In December 1986, Wee gave respects to Minister of National Development Teh Cheang Wan, who had committed suicide following allegations of corruption. In March 1987, Wee, along with Attorney-General Tan Boon Teik, signed revised versions of the statutes of Singapore. In January 1988, Wee was involved in the Allan Ng affair, after Ng told Wee that Attorney-General Tan refused to prosecute Wee Cho Yaw, who was harassing Ng; his allegations were later discovered to be unfounded. In February 1988, Wee reappointed Ridzwan Dzafir as president of the Muslim Religious Council. In October 1988, on the advice of prime minister Lee, Wee extended Chief Justice Wee Chong Jin's term by two more years. He also took his first ride on the newly established Mass Rapid Transit system.

In January 1989, he was admitted to the Singapore General Hospital to undergo surgery for a cancerous growth in his rectum. While recovering, it was discovered that Wee also had an enlarged prostate during a bladder examination. He underwent a second surgery in February for his prostate. In March 1989, Taiwanese president Lee Teng-hui visited Wee in the hospital, following his four-day visit to Singapore on the invitation of Wee. He was the first to meet Wee after his surgery and it was described as an "informal meeting". Former minister Lim Kim San acted as president from 6 to 9 March during Wee's recovery. In April 1989, after Wee had recovered, he met with Togolese president Gnassingbé Eyadéma upon his visit.

==== Chaim Herzog's visit to Singapore ====
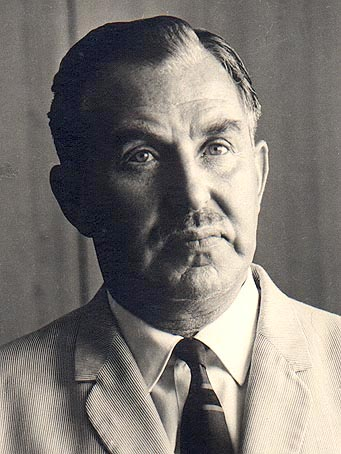
Wee's invitation of Israeli president Chaim Herzog (pictured) to visit Singapore was controversial.

In November 1986, Wee invited Israeli president Chaim Herzog to Singapore for a three-day visit, which drew criticism from nearby countries such as Malaysia and Indonesia. The Indonesian Foreign Ministry was upset by Singapore's decision in inviting Herzog, further stating that "the Indonesian government considers Singapore as apparently not having sufficient sensitivity towards a number of ASEAN countries vis-a-vis Israel." It was also the first time since 1968 that Indonesia had opposed a decision made by Singapore's government. The Palestine Liberation Organization's (PLO) branch in Kuala Lumpur further requested Singapore to rethink the decision as it "[would] hurt the feelings of the Muslim world." Other organisations that opposed Herzog's visit included Muslim students of the Islamic movement Muhammadiyah in Jakarta and the Malaysian political party Parti Sosialis Rakyat Malaysia.

Upon Herzog's arrival from 18 to 20 November, where it was the first visit by an Israeli head of state to Singapore, Wee spoke about creating peace between Israel and Palestine, maintaining good relations between Israel and Singapore, and strengthening the trade between the two countries. Herzog himself spoke about the issues in the Middle East, stating that "we [have] maintained all along that it is impossible to resolve any problem without negotiations." After his visit, Awang Selamat of Utusan Malaysia criticised the meeting, calling Singapore a "loyal and docile second 'mistress'" of the United States and an "international prostitute". Senior Minister S. Rajaratnam defended their decision to invite Herzog, which was seen as criticism by Awang, who further described Singapore as a "spokesman for Israeli interests in the region." In January 1987, the PLO apologised to Wee for "disparaging" comments made about him by a representative from their Kuala Lumpur branch in reference to Herzog's visit to Singapore. PLO's chairman Yasser Arafat issued a statement to the Ministry of Foreign Affairs, stating that "the PLO did not approve, in any way, the references by [the representative]"; Singapore accepted the apology.

==== 1989 presidential election ====
At the 1989 presidential election, Wee was nominated for a second term as president by Lee again. He received another unanimous agreement, being sworn in for a second four-year term. Upon his reelection, he stated, "The reason why I could go on like this is the encouragement and the support that the government as well as the people have given me." The 1989 presidential election was initially planned to have a president elected by popular vote by the people, but amendments to the constitution for a president elected by popular vote were not ready yet. Lee stated about this that, "The president after him is likely to be elected by the whole electorate." Member of Parliament for Jalan Besar Group Representation Constituency Sidek Saniff stated of Wee that there was "no class barrier, much less a dividing wall when [Wee] comes into contact with Malays, Chinese, Indians, Eurasians, Buddhists, Muslims, Christians, Hindus, and others".

=== Second presidential term (1989–1993) ===
External image
- Wee being sworn in by Chief Justice Wee Chong Jin for his second term, 1989 via National Archives of Singapore

Following his successful reelection for president, Wee began his second term on 2 September 1989. In February 1990, Wee received the Family Order of Laila Utama from the Sultan of Brunei Hassanal Bolkiah, whom he gave the Darjah Utama Temasek. In June 1990, Mexican president Carlos Salinas de Gortari visited Singapore, where he spoke with Wee about improving diplomatic relations and trade between the countries. A Mexico Fund was then set up in Singapore. In November 1990, Lee gave his resignation to Wee as prime minister, with Goh Chok Tong officially succeeding him. Wee subsequently swore Goh and his new cabinet in on 28 November. He also swore in the first Nominated Members of Parliament Maurice Choo and Leong Chee Whye.

During Wee's second term, Parliament amended the constitution in November 1991, to allow for an elected president who could veto key political appointments and the use of government reserves. The new act allowed the president to examine how the government's reserves were spent, decide on key appointments, check against abuses of power under the Internal Security Act and the Maintenance of Religious Harmony Act, and check investigations done by the Corrupt Practices Investigation Bureau. As the current president at the time, Wee was given control of the new presidential powers despite not having been elected by popular vote and instead by government at the 1989 presidential election. In April 1992, Wee opened the Jurong Bird Park's new S$18 million panorail system. In July 1992, Wee made the first visit by a Singaporean head of state to Brunei, where he met with Sultan Hassanal Bolkiah and discussed relations between the countries. In August 1992, he swore in the first Presidential Council for Religious Harmony.

For the ensuing presidential election in 1993, the first in Singapore to be decided by popular vote, Wee decided not to enter his candidacy and went into retirement upon the completion of his second term. Prime minister Goh had approached him to see if he would run for a third term, however Wee refused due to his age. Upon the end of his term on 1 September, several Members of Parliament (MP) paid tribute to Wee, including Goh, Ayer Rajah's MP Tan Cheng Bock, Nominated MP Walter Woon, Defense Minister Yeo Ning Hong, and Potong Pasir's MP Chiam See Tong. In recognition of his services, he was awarded the Darjah Utama Temasek.

==== China–Singapore relations ====
In September 1991, Wee went to China for an eight day visit, the first for a Singaporean head of state. This came after China established relations with Singapore the previous year, and upon the invitation of Chinese president Yang Shangkun. Wee's delegation consisted of First Lady Koh Sok Hiong, Labour Minister Lee Yock Suan, Foreign Affairs Minister Wong Kan Seng, Nation Development Minister of State Lim Hng Kiang, and Members of Parliament K. Shanmugam and Ho Peng Kee. During his visit, Wee visited Beijing, Xi'an, Guilin, Guangzhou, Zhongsan, and Zhuhai, meeting with Yang, Premier Li Peng, and General Secretary Jiang Zemin while in Beijing. He discussed with Yang the relations between the countries, economic growth, and invited him to visit Singapore in return. Furthermore, Wee stated that Singapore welcomed China's interest in establishing relations with the other ASEAN countries. Upon his return to Singapore, Wee thanked the Chinese for "[treating] us, a small country, as an equal" and for "[making] time for us".

In January 1992, Yang visited Singapore for four days upon Wee's invitation the previous year; he also visited Malaysia. In Singapore, Wee spoke about the economy between them, being around S$4 billion in 1991, and that it could be improved with China integrating with the Asia–Pacific region. He additionally suggested trade, tourism, and investments to be other ways to improve the economy. Yang also confirmed that he would improve relations with Singapore and the other ASEAN nations; he was additionally the highest-ranking Chinese official to visit Singapore since 1990. In February 1992, Wee was called on by Chinese Minister of Radio, Film and Television Ai Zhisheng when he visited.

==== Malaysia–Singapore relations ====
In November 1991, Wee made a visit to Malaysia, the first for a Singaporean head of state since Singapore's independence in 1965. He was described to have been given "VVIP treatment", and his visit was highly publicised in Malaysian newspapers. During his four day visit, he went to Kuala Lumpur, Shah Alam, Kedah, and Langkawi, further meeting with the Yang di-Pertuan Agong Azlan Shah of Perak and Malaysian prime minister Mahathir Mohamad. Wee was accompanied by a 14-member delegation, and he met with Malaysian education minister Sulaiman Daud upon his arrival at Kuala Lumpur International Airport. Wee discussed bilateral relations, economic exchanges, and business missions with Shah during a banquet held in his honour. After his visit, where he returned to Singapore from Subang Airport, both Wee and Malaysian High Commissioner to Singapore Zainal Abidin Mokhtar regarded the meeting as successful.

== Post-presidency (1993–2005) ==
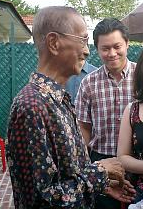
Wee in 2003

After leaving office, he was given an honorary degree of Doctor of Letters by the National University of Singapore in August 1994. He was also made an honorary member of the Singapore Recreation Club, becoming the fifth person to be made such, and an honorary fellow with the Academy of Medicine by Chao Tzee Cheng. Wee was also appointed a deputy registrar of marriages by Senior Minister of State Ch'ng Jit Koon. In October 1994, he visited Bangkok, Thailand, and had a meeting with Thai King Bhumibol Adulyadej during his four-day trip there. He was accompanied by his wife, Singaporean ambassador Chin Siat Yoon, and former Thai Foreign Minister Siddhi Savetsila.

In 1995, a professorship in his name, the Wee Kim Wee Professorship in Communication Studies, was launched by the Nanyang Technological University. In 1997, he resigned as a member and chairman of Liang Court's audit committee. In 2002, he served as the chairman of the Singapore Millennium Foundation. In 2004, Wee published his autobiography, Glimpses and Reflections. He donated the sales produced from the first 250 books to charity, and further gave a signed copy to the largest donor of S$1,000 or more. Throughout his presidency and later life, Wee was frequently known as a "People's President", and was remembered for his humility and warmth.

== Personal life and death ==
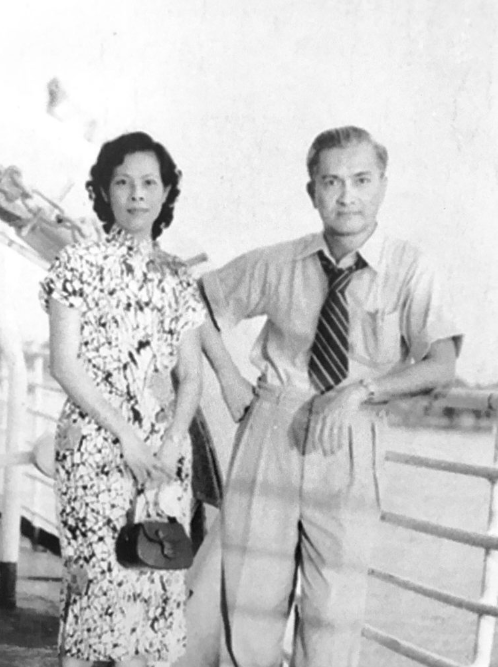
Wee and Koh Sok Hiong in 1950, on board the SS Chusan

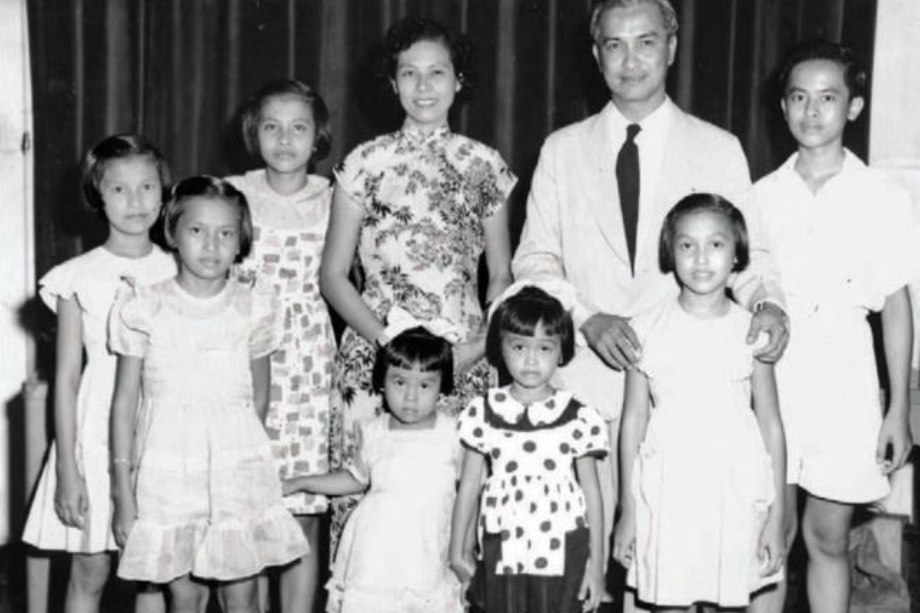
Wee and his family, 1952

Wee married his wife, Koh Sok Hiong (1916–2018), in 1936 and they had seven children together. On 2 May 2005, at 5:10 SST, Wee died from a relapse of prostate cancer in his home at Siglap Plain; he was 89. He had been sick for the past month, and had asked to return home two days before his death. According to his son, he had requested to not be buried at the Kranji State Cemetery, where previous presidents Yusof Ishak and Benjamin Sheares had been buried, and instead was cremated at the Mandai Crematorium and Columbarium.

Before being cremated, Wee's body was laid in state at the Istana. Those who paid respects included president S. R. Nathan, prime minister Lee Hsien Loong, minister mentor Lee Kuan Yew, senior minister Goh Chok Tong, deputy prime ministers Tony Tan, Toh Chin Chye, and S. Jayakumar, acting Foreign Affairs Minister Raymond Lim, Trade and Industry Minister Lim Hng Kiang, Chief Justice Yong Pung How, and National Development Minister Mah Bow Tan. Foreign dignitaries who paid their respects included Indonesian vice-president Jusuf Kalla, former Malaysian Education Minister Khir Johari, Malaysian Housing Minister Ong Ka Ting, and the ambassadors of Vietnam, Laos, Hungary, and the United States. Thousands of Singaporeans also visited Wee when he laid in state from 3 to 4 May.

On 5 May, Wee's body was driven in a hearse back to his home in Siglap Plain for a private wake. It briefly stopped at Cavenagh Court, where Wee owned an apartment. He was subsequently cremated at the Mandai Crematorium and Columbarium on 6 May, Friday, and his ashes were kept there.

=== Legacy ===
In 2006, the Nanyang Technological University renamed its School of Communication Studies after Wee to the Wee Kim Wee School of Communication and Information. The Wee Kim Wee Legacy Fund was launched alongside the renaming of the school, with over S$27 million raised for the fund. The Centre for Cross-Cultural Studies at Singapore Management University (SMU) was also renamed as the Wee Kim Wee Centre in honour of him. In 2022, it was announced that the Wee Kim Wee Room would be opened at SMU's Administration Building at Bras Basah in 2023. It serves as a recreation of Wee's office and includes many of his personal items. A biography written by Cheong Suk-Wai on Wee was published in 2025.

== Honours ==
In 1994, Wee was given an honorary degree of Doctor of Letters by the National University of Singapore.

=== National ===
- Singapore:
  - Darjah Utama Temasek, 1st Class
  - Pingat Bakti Masyarakat
  - Bintang Bakti Masyarakat
  - Pingat Jasa Gemilang

=== Foreign ===
- Brunei:
  - Family Order of Laila Utama

Political offices
Preceded by Devan Nair	President of Singapore; 1985–1993	Succeeded by Ong Teng Cheong
