= Koh Sok Hiong =

First Lady of Singapore from 1985 to 1993

- 许淑香
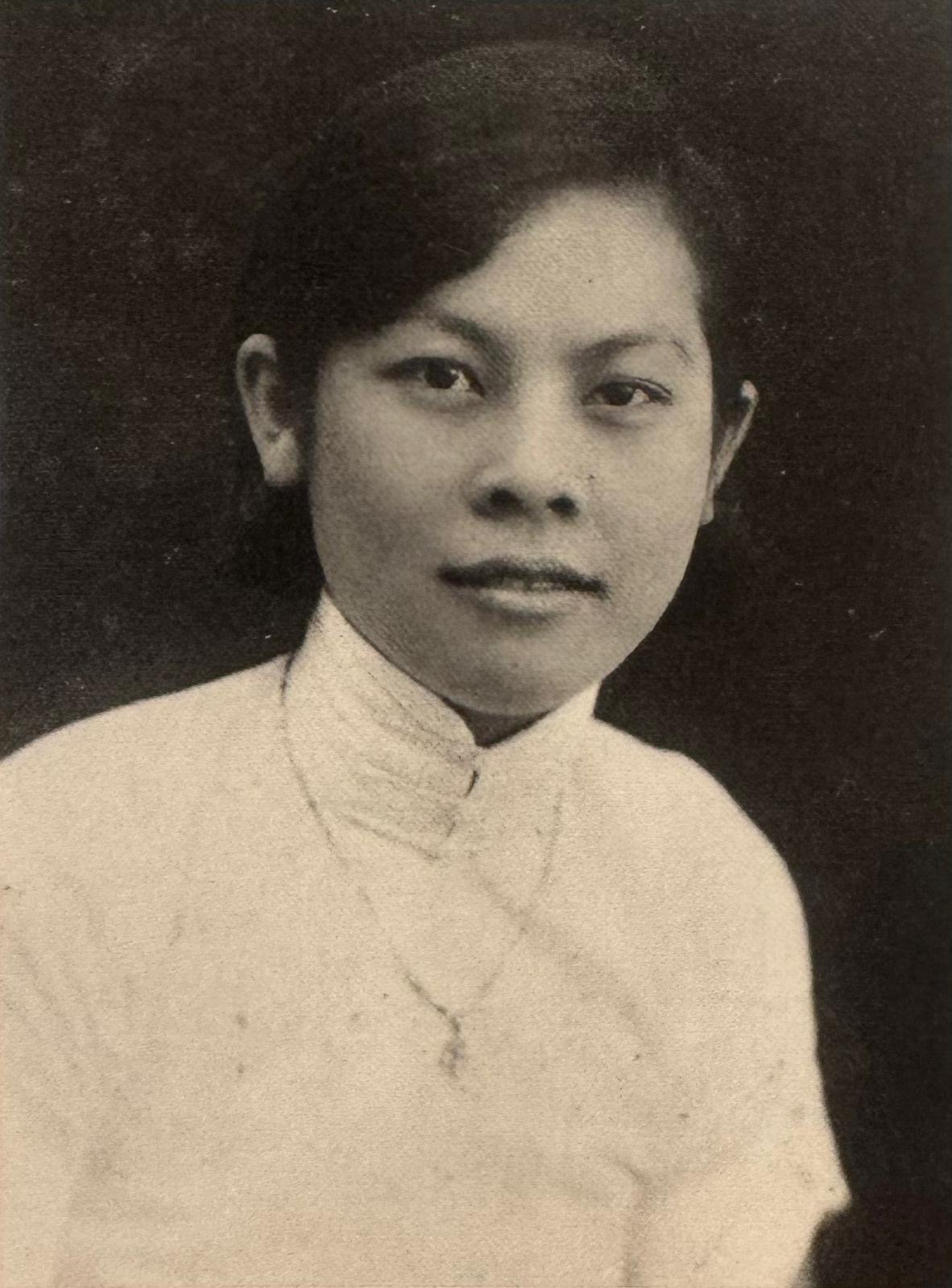
- Koh in 1934

First Lady of Singapore
- In office 2 September 1985 – 1 September 1993
- President: Wee Kim Wee
- Preceded by: Avadai Dhanam Lakshimi
- Succeeded by: Ling Siew May

Personal details
- Born: 5 July 1916 Singapore, Straits Settlements
- Died: 7 July 2018 (aged 102) Changi General Hospital, Singapore
- Spouse: Wee Kim Wee (m. 1936; died 2005)
- Children: 7

Koh Sok Hiong (simplified Chinese: 许淑香; traditional Chinese: 許淑香; Pe̍h-ōe-jī: Khó͘ Siok-hiong; pinyin: Xǔ Shūxiāng; 5 July 1916 – 7 July 2018), also known as Mrs Wee Kim Wee, was a Singaporean philanthropist and chef who was the First Lady of Singapore when her husband, Wee Kim Wee, served as president from 1985 to 1993. Born in Singapore during colonial rule, Koh studied at Nanyang Girls' High School before marrying Wee in 1936. During Wee's career as a diplomat, she helped host formal dinner parties for him, including cooking food for the dinners.

Koh usually cooked Peranakan cuisine, releasing a book in 2005 compiling of all of her recipes. During her time as First Lady, she performed philanthropic work for multiple charities and was also noted for her fashion, particularly that for wearing cheongsams, a Chinese dress. In later years, she suffered a stroke and used a wheelchair. Koh died on 7 July 2018.

== Early life and marriage ==
Koh was born on 5 July 1916 (Note: The Straits Times reported that she died on 7 July, two days after her birthday, making her birthdate 5 July 1916.) at Kim Seng Road in Singapore, which was then a part of the Straits Settlements; she was the eldest of eight children to Khor Chwee Thor and Koh See Neo. Her father Khor was a Hokkien businessman who built boats while her mother See Neo was a nyonya. Khor arrived in Singapore under British rule when he was sixteen years old, where he set up a business selling lighters after having previously worked as a labourer. In Koh's youth, she wanted to study to become a teacher, but Khor did not believe in women's education and did not send her to school; See Neo would later send Koh and her sister to school with her own funds.

Being Mandarin-educated, she studied at Hwa Chiau Chinese and English School in Pasir Panjang from 1924 to 1932, attending Nanyang Girls' High School from 1935 to 1936 for her secondary education. In 1936, Koh married Wee Kim Wee in an arranged marriage between their families; she was eighteen years old. Their wedding was conducted in Mandarin at the United Chinese Library. Before her arranged marriage, Koh's grandmother had wanted to watch Koh marry before she died, prompting Koh to allow her elders to choose her husband. Among the three suitors was Wee, who was considered unlikely due to his low wealth, but Koh's brother knew him well and convinced their grandmother to pick Wee. Although Koh's family members disagreed on the choice of Wee, Koh's grandmother stated: "If your karma is good, the clerk you marry may one day become the emperor. If your karma is bad, the emperor you marry may one day become a clerk." (Note: Original: "如果你的命是好的，嫁一個職員他可能會變成一個皇帝。如果你的命是坏的，嫁一個皇帝他也可能變成一個職員。")

== Career ==
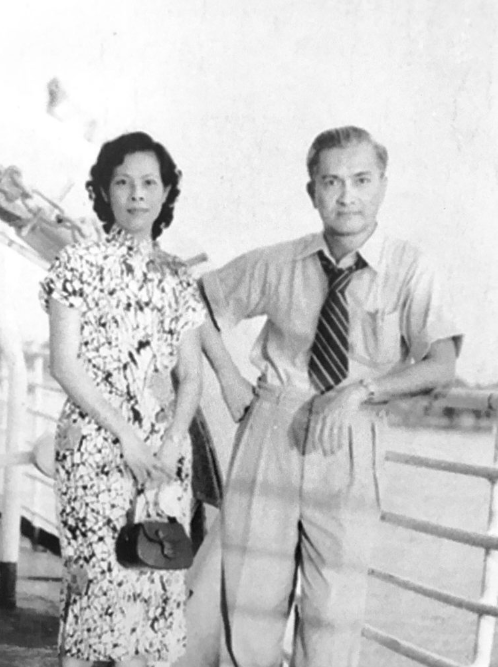
Koh and Wee onboard the SS Chusan, November 1950

During her marriage to Wee, she worked as a housewife, being described as a "teacher, cook, tailor, washerwoman, doctor, [and] hairdresser" to their children. In 1965, she worked as a food writer for magazine Her World in a column titled "Malaysian Kitchen", writing nyonya recipes. Whilst Wee worked as a diplomat, Koh often cooked and hosted dinner parties for him, with Wee's personal assistant stating about Koh that "cooking and managing a formal sit-down official dinner for 20 guests was just as easy as preparing for a one-to-one lunch." Diplomat Tommy Koh also praised her cooking, recalling that she once cooked 12 dishes for a dinner in Tokyo held in his honour while Wee was Singapore's Ambassador to Japan.

Having been taught cooking when she was ten years old by her grandmother, Koh could manage "a formal sit down official dinner for 20 guests" or "Singapore's National Day reception for 500 to 600 guests", according to Wee's personal assistant from 1980 to 1983, Sylvia Toh.

=== First Lady of Singapore (1985–1993) ===
In 1985, Koh became the 4th First Lady of Singapore after her husband Wee was elected the president of Singapore by parliament. Her first public appearance was at a charity event organised by the Spastic Children's Association Singapore and the Lioness and Lion's Clubs of Singapore. During her time as First Lady, she did philanthropy work and supported charities such as Girl Guides Singapore, Life Community Services Society, and Jamiyah Home for the Aged, serving as the patron of the former from 1985 to 1994. In 1986, she met Pope John Paul II upon his visit to Singapore. In 1989, Koh was the guest of honour at a charity run, and presented a S$20,000 cheque to the Singapore Anti-Narcotics Association on behalf of the Singapore Recreation Club.

In 1990, Koh participated in a charity food fair organised by the Women's Department of the Muslim Missionary Society Singapore in Geylang. Koh was also known for her fashion and wearing cheongsams, a traditional Chinese dress. She tended to wear cheongsams with different styles and fabrics for various events, with most in red, her favourite colour. In 1993, Koh stepped down as First Lady after Wee's presidential term ended. Speaking in tribute of the leaving president and First Lady, prime minister Goh Chok Tong stated that Koh had "contributed to the prestige and respectability of the presidency", and that the Wees would be remembered "with deep affection and respect".

== Personal life and death ==
Wee and Koh had seven children. In 1993, Koh stated that she suffered from health issues such as shingles and arthritis. In 1996, Koh and Wee celebrated their 60th marriage anniversary together at a formal dinner, which included president Ong Teng Cheong, First Lady Ling Siew May, prime minister Goh, and former First Lady Puan Noor Aishah, along with their friends and family. Wee died in 2005. In 2010, Koh wrote a cookbook titled Cooking for the President: Reflections & Recipes of Mrs Wee Kim Wee, which compiled over 200 of her Peranakan recipes and was published by her daughter. In 2015, she suffered a stroke that left her using a wheelchair and being tube-fed. Throughout her life, she was commonly known as Mrs Wee Kim Wee.

On 7 July 2018, Koh died at Changi General Hospital after suffering from some breathing difficulties at 102. She was survived by her 6 children, (Note: Koh had 7 children but her only son, Bill Wee Hock Kee, predeceased her in 2015.) 13 grandchildren, and 17 great-grandchildren. A wake was held at her home in Siglap Plain before a cortege brought her to Mandai Crematorium and Columbarium, where she was cremated. Among those who paid tribute were prime minister Lee Hsien Loong, president Halimah Yacob, First Gentleman Mohammed Abdullah Alhabshee, former president Tony Tan, and finance minister Heng Swee Keat. In 2022, her daughter Wee Eng Hwa republished a new edition of Cooking for the President, featuring alternative ingredients for some of the 227 recipes.
