= Wee Chong Jin =

Singaporean jurist (1917–2005)

Yang Berbahagia Tan Sri Wee Chong Jin DUBC PMN
- 黃宗仁

President of Singapore
- Acting; 28 March 1985 – 31 March 1985
- Prime Minister: Lee Kuan Yew
- Preceded by: Devan Nair
- Succeeded by: Yeoh Ghim Seng (acting)
- Acting; 12 May 1981 – 14 May 1981
- Prime Minister: Lee Kuan Yew
- Preceded by: Benjamin Sheares
- Succeeded by: Yeoh Ghim Seng (acting)

1st Chief Justice of Singapore
- In office 5 January 1963 – 27 September 1990
- President: Yusof Ishak; Yeoh Ghim Seng (acting); Benjamin Sheares; Devan Nair; Himself (acting); Wee Kim Wee
- Preceded by: Alan Rose
- Succeeded by: Yong Pung How

Head, Presidential Council for Religious Harmony
- In office 1992–2005

Personal details
- Born: 28 September 1917 Penang, Straits Settlements
- Died: 5 June 2005 (aged 87) Singapore
- Cause of death: Lung and brain cancer
- Resting place: Mandai Crematorium and Columbarium
- Spouse: Cecilia Mary Henderson
- Children: 4
- Education: St John's College, Cambridge

Chinese name
- Traditional Chinese: 黃宗仁
- Simplified Chinese: 黄宗仁
- Hanyu Pinyin: Huáng Zōngrén
- Jyutping: Wong4 Zung1 Jan4

Wee Chong Jin (Chinese: 黃宗仁; pinyin: Huáng Zōngrén; 28 September 1917 – 5 June 2005) was a Malayan-born Singaporean jurist who served as a chief justice of Singapore for 27 years, from 1963 to 1990, where he was the first Asian lawyer appointed as a judge to head the Supreme Court of Singapore, and the longest-serving chief justice in the Commonwealth.

== Early life ==
Wee was born in 1917 to parents Wee Gim Puay and Lim Paik Yew in Penang, which was then a part of the Straits Settlements. He received his early education at the Penang Free School, and read law at St John's College, Cambridge. He was called to Bar at the Middle Temple in November 1938, and was admitted as an Advocate and Solicitor of Straits Settlements in 1940 upon returning to Penang.

== Legal career ==
Wee practised law in Malaya and Singapore from 1940 to 1957, with the firm Wee Swee Teow and Co.

=== Judicial career ===
Wee became the first Asian lawyer to be appointed to the position of a judge at the Supreme Court of Singapore on 15 August 1957, and subsequently appointed Chief Justice of Singapore on 5 January 1963. His appointment as Chief Justice marked the end of the century-old tradition of appointing British Chief Justices – the last of whom was Sir Alan Rose – for Singapore. Wee remained in the position for 27 years, making him the longest-serving chief justice not only in Singapore, but also in the Commonwealth.

== Other roles ==
Wee also served as the first chairman of the Presidential Council for Minority Rights from 1973 and remained at its helm for 18 years. Wee assumed the post of the acting President of Singapore for two days when Devan Nair stepped down as President. Wee Chong Jin had also stepped in when Singapore's heads of state were either away or indisposed. He had stood in for Yusof Ishak when he was Yang di-Pertuan Negara of Singapore and also for President Benjamin Sheares. He was the first president of the Singapore Academy of Law in 1988. In August 1991, he was awarded the Distinguished Service Order. In April 1992, Wee was made an Honorary Member and Fellow of the Singapore Academy of Law for life – the highest honour made to a person by the Academy. He served as a legal consultant of the Supreme Court of Singapore after his retirement on 27 September 1990, and was diagnosed with lung cancer in 2004.

== Personal life ==
Wee was also known for his love for sports, as he was an outstanding cricketer for Cambridge University in 1937 and a keen golfer serving as President of the Singapore Golf Association from 1962 to 2002.

Wee died on 5 June 2005 of complications from lung and brain cancer. A funeral was held at the Catholic Church of St. Ignatius at King's Road in Bukit Timah before his body was cremated at the Mandai Crematorium. Wee is survived by his wife, Cecilia Henderson, three sons, Laurence, John and Patrick, and one daughter, Veronica, and his grandchildren, Laura, Nicole, David and Michael.

== Honours ==
- Distinguished Service Order, in 1991.

=== Honour of Malaysia ===
- Malaysia
  - Commander of the Order of the Defender of the Realm (P.M.N.) – Tan Sri (1965)

== See also ==
- Chief Justice of Singapore
- Judicial officers of the Republic of Singapore
- Judicial system of Singapore
