= List of ambassadors of Singapore to South Korea =

Singapore Ambassador to South Korea
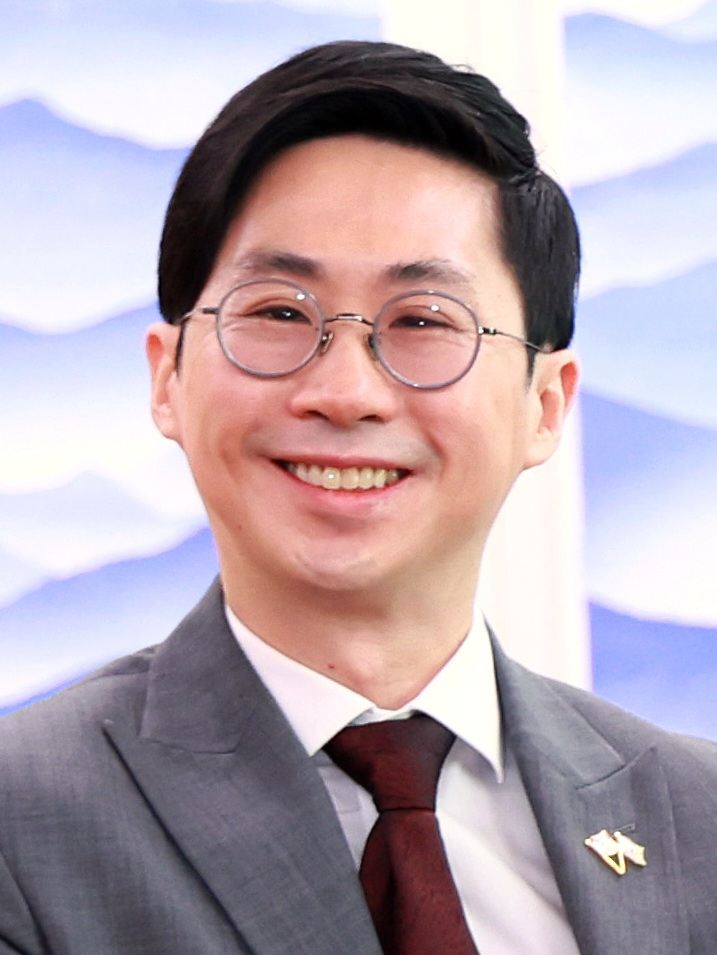
- Incumbent; Wong Kai Jiun since 2025
- Inaugural holder: Wee Mon Cheng
- Formation: 9 November 1978; 47 years ago

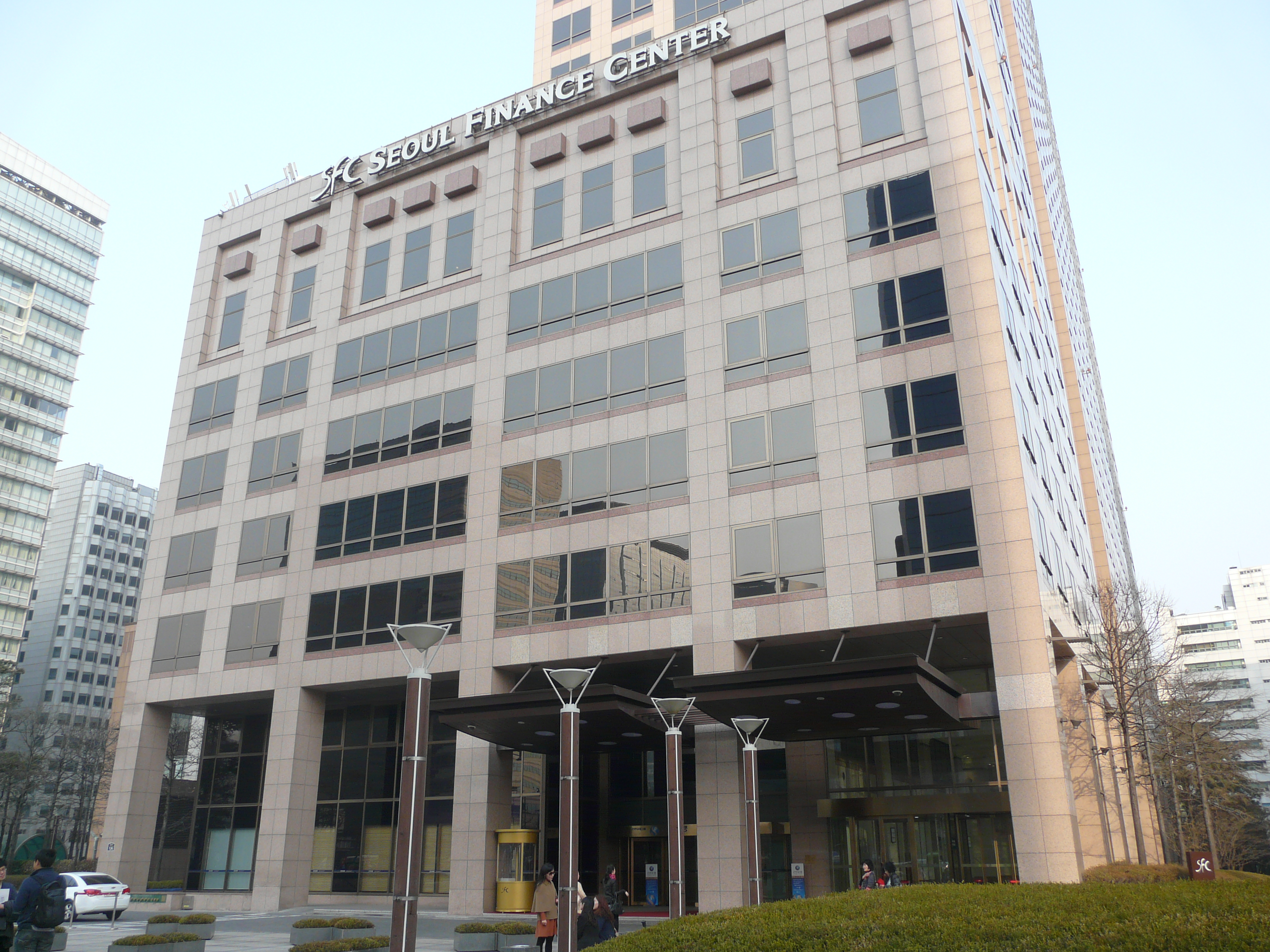
The Embassy of Singapore in Seoul is located on the 3rd floor of the Seoul Finance Center.

This is a list of ambassadors of Singapore to the South Korea.

No.	Name	Date of appointment
–	Wee Mon Cheng	9 November 1978
–	Wee Kim Wee	26 February 1981
–	Lee Khoon Choy	19 October 1984
–	Cheng Tong Fatt	November 1988
1	Raymond Wong Heng Tem	1 November 1990
2	Pang Eng Fong	6 December 1994
3	Michael Teo	October 1996
4	Calvin Eu Mun Hoo	13 March 2002
5	Chua Thai Keong	4 October 2006
6	Peter Tan Hai Chuan	3 May 2011
7	Yip Wei Kiat	2 April 2015
8	Eric Teo	21 August 2019
9	Wong Kai Jiun	17 June 2025

== See also ==
- Singapore–South Korea relations
