= 1989 Singaporean presidential election =

Presidential election in Singapore

- 31 August 1989
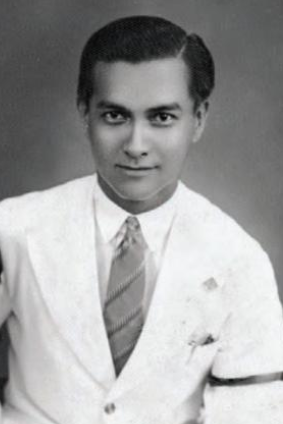
Nominee	Wee Kim Wee
Party	Independent
Electoral vote	69
President before election
Wee Kim Wee
Independent
Elected President
Wee Kim Wee
Independent

An indirect presidential election was held in Singapore on 31 August 1989.

During the election, 69 members of Parliament were present and 13 members were absent. Wee Kim Wee was re-elected by the Parliament of Singapore. Wee was sworn in for his second term as president on 2 September 1989.

== Results ==
Candidate	Party	Votes	%
Wee Kim Wee	Independent	69	100.00
Total		69	100.00
Total votes		69	–
Registered voters/turnout		82	84.15
