= Mandai Crematorium and Columbarium =

Burial place in Singapore

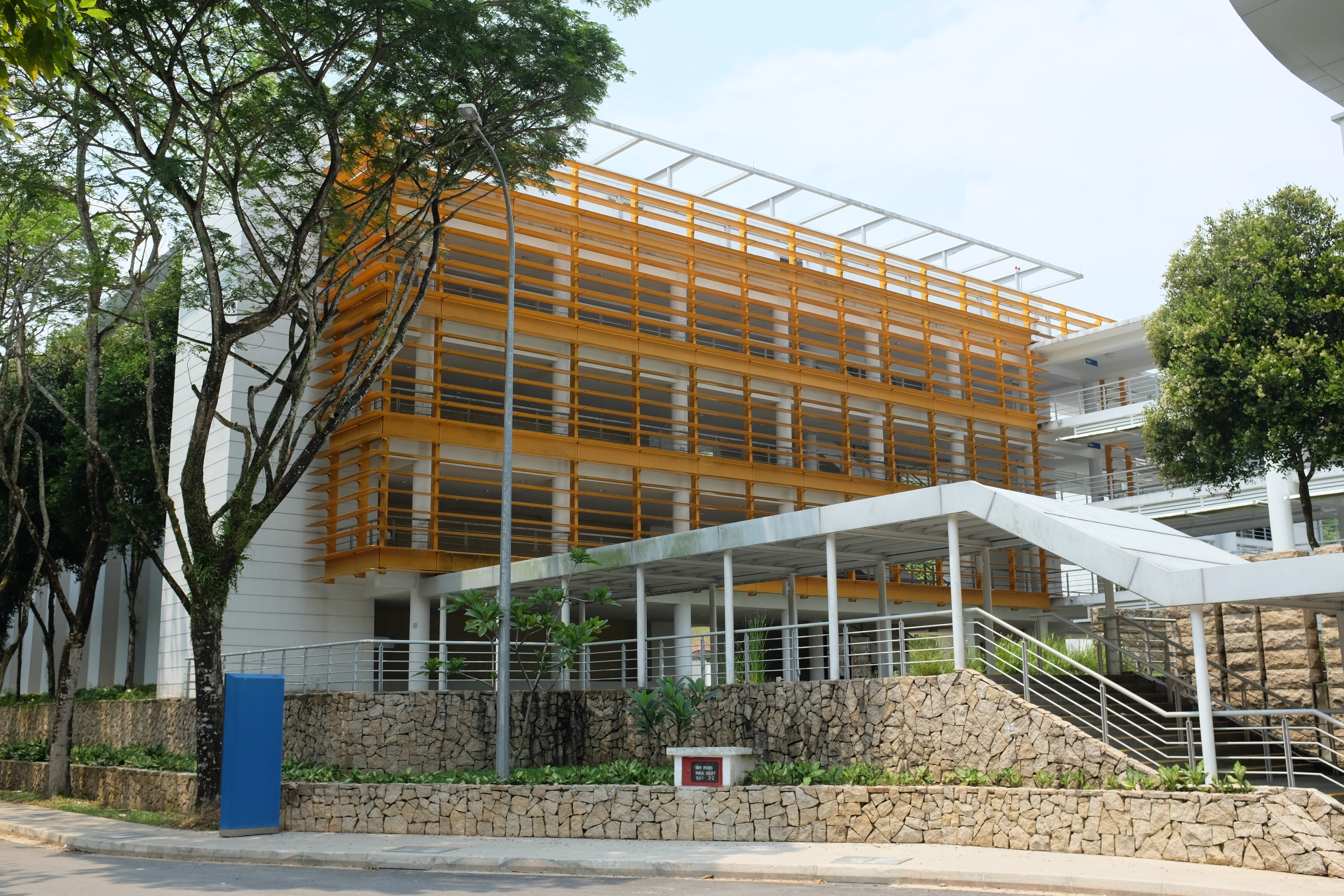

General information
- Type: Crematorium, columbarium complex
- Location: Mandai, Singapore; 300 Mandai Road, Singapore 779393
- Coordinates: 1°24′50″N 103°48′35″E
- Completed: 1982; 44 years ago
- Owner: National Environment Agency

Mandai Crematorium and Columbarium is a crematorium and columbarium complex located at Mandai Road in Mandai, Singapore. The complex is operated by the Government of Singapore under the National Environment Agency. It is one of three government crematoria in Singapore, the other two being the Choa Chu Kang Columbarium and Yishun Columbarium.

Mandai Crematorium and Columbarium is located not far from Yishun New Town.

This complex is one of the final resting places for many Singaporeans due to the country's limited landspace to host cemeteries for the dead.

== History ==
With Mount Vernon Crematorium, the only government crematorium reaching its maximum capacity in the late 1970s, a need for a second crematorium arose. The Government chose a plot of land at Mandai to build Singapore's second crematorium. Completed in 1982, it consists of 4 big cremators and 4 small cremators, and 1200 niches. Shortly after its opening, it was designated to cremate exhumed remains from closed down cemeteries in Singapore.

In 2000, the government decided that all cremation services would be consolidated at Mandai. So, a new extension was built just south of the original complex. Completed in mid 2004, this complex comprises four service halls, four viewing halls, 12 cremators and one waiting hall, replacing the Mount Vernon Crematorium, which closed down on the same day the new complex opened. The columbarium was also expanded to include remains displaced from the closure of Mount Vernon Crematorium as well.

To meet the growing demand of the island's population, an extension of Mandai Crematorium, known as Mandai North Crematorium was built and opened on 15 August 2025. Mandai North Crematorium will house six service halls and 18 cremators upon its completion.

== Notable cremations ==
Death Year	Name	Notes
2004	Huang Na	8-year-old girl brutally murdered by Took Leng How, who was subsequently executed in 2006.
2004	Goh Sin Tub	Pioneer of Singaporean literature
2005	Wee Kim Wee	4th President of Singapore
2005	Wee Chong Jin	1st Chief Justice of Singapore
2006	Lai Kew Chai	Ex-High Court judge
2006	S. Rajaratnam	1st Senior Minister & 2nd Deputy Prime Minister of Singapore
2006	Lim Kim San	Former Minister of Finance, Minister of Communications, Minister of Education, Minister of National Development & Minister for Sustainability and the Environment
2007	Reuben Kee	Amongst the 5 victims of the 2007 Tonlé Sap dragon boat accident
2010	Goh Keng Swee	2nd Deputy Prime Minister of Singapore
2010	Balaji Sadasivan	Singapore's Former Senior Minister of State for Foreign Affairs
2010	Kwa Geok Choo	The wife of 1st Prime Minister Lee Kuan Yew
2012	Toh Chin Chye	1st Deputy Prime Minister of Singapore
2012	Tan Boon Teik	2nd Attorney-General of Singapore
2012	Emma Yong	Mediacorp actress and member of Dim Sum Dollies
2015	Lee Kuan Yew	1st Prime Minister of Singapore
2016	S. R. Nathan	6th President of Singapore
2017	Tan See Lai	Pioneering Singaporean newscaster, television producer and educator
2018	Koh Sok Hiong	The wife of 4th President of Singapore Wee Kim Wee
2019	Aloysius Pang	Singaporean artiste who died during reservist training in New Zealand
2019	Bai Yan	Veteran Singaporean artiste
2020	Yong Pung How	2nd Chief Justice of Singapore
2021	Ling How Doong	Former opposition MP of Singapore Democratic Party
2023	Richard Hu	Longest serving Minister Of Finance
2024	Wee Cho Yaw	Former UOB chairman and businessman
2024	Ch'ng Jit Koon	Former Senior Minister Of State
2024	Lee Wei Ling	Singaporean neurologist, only daughter of founding Prime Minister Lee Kuan Yew
2025	Moses Lim	Singaporean comedian and actor
2026	Liu Thai Ker	Singaporean Architect and Master Planner

== Notable interments ==
- Wong Ming Yang (1951–1982), first spouse of 3rd Prime Minister Lee Hsien Loong
- Lim Chin Siong (1933–1996), former Secretary-General of Barisan Sosialis
- Lee Chin Koon (1903–1997), father of 1st Prime Minister Lee Kuan Yew
- Wee Kim Wee (1915–2005), 4th President of Singapore
- Goh Keng Swee (1918–2010), 2nd Deputy Prime Minister of Singapore
- Toh Chin Chye (1921–2012), 1st Deputy Prime Minister of Singapore
- Koh Sok Hiong (1916–2018), former First Lady of Singapore and spouse of 4th President Wee Kim Wee

== Gallery ==
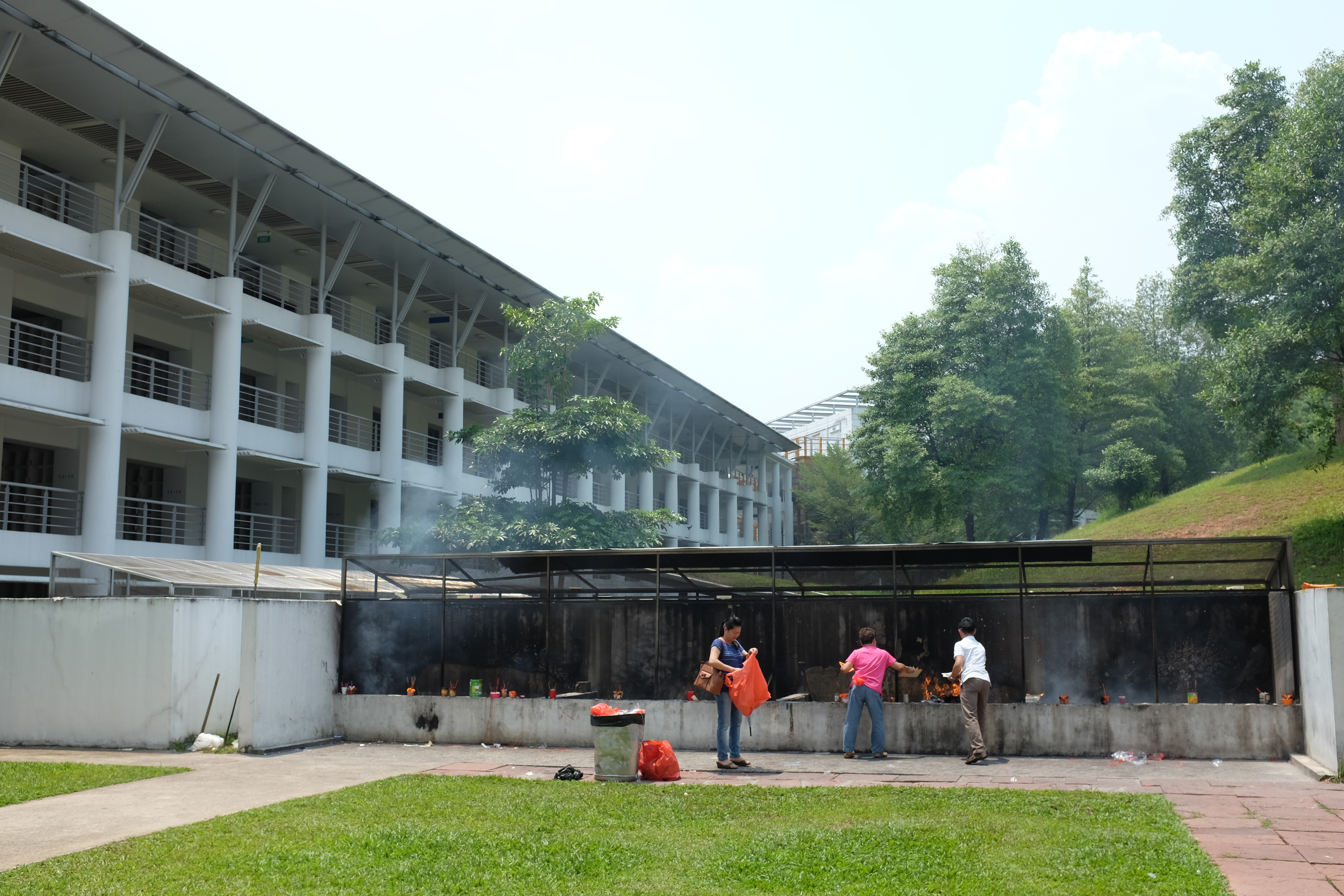

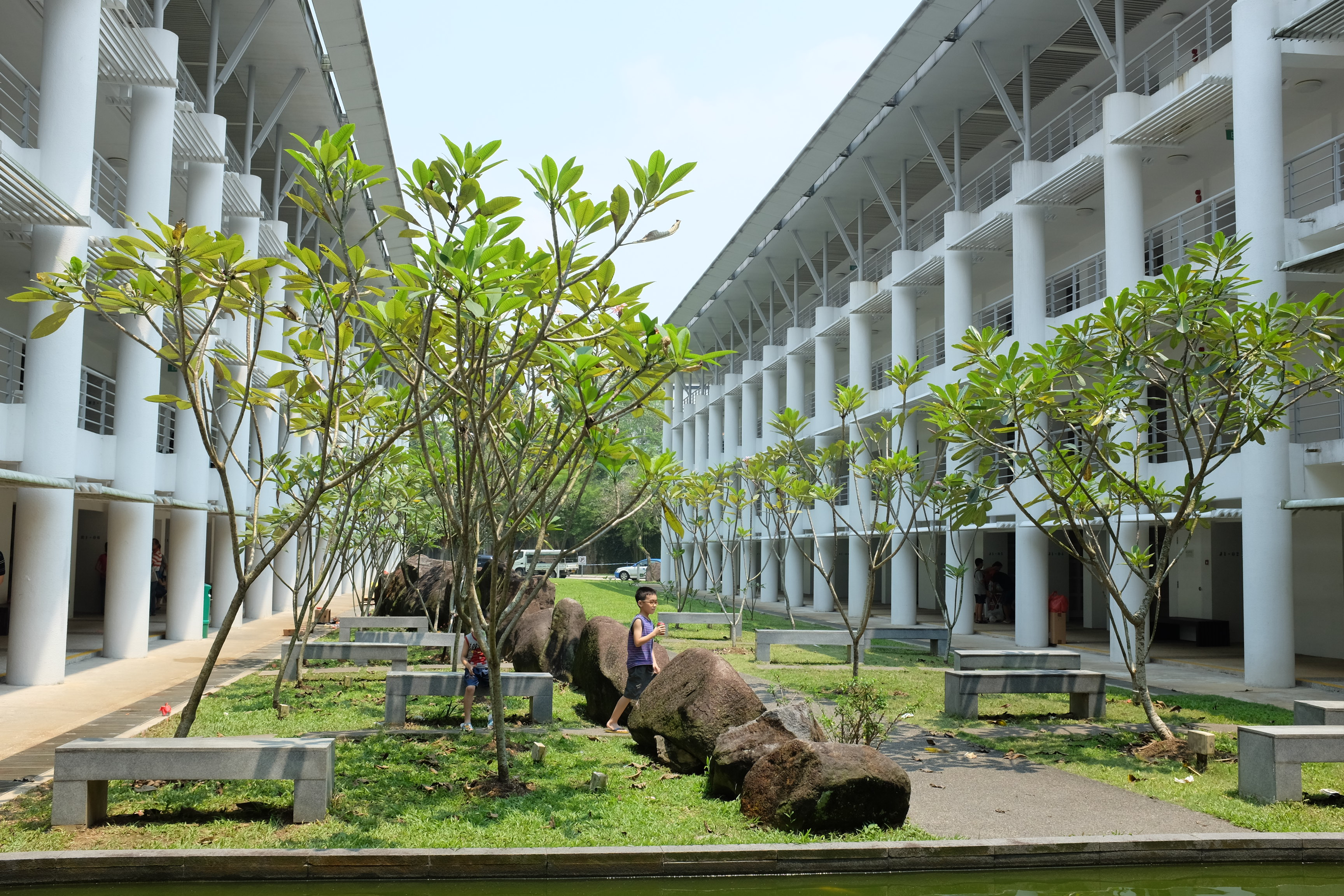

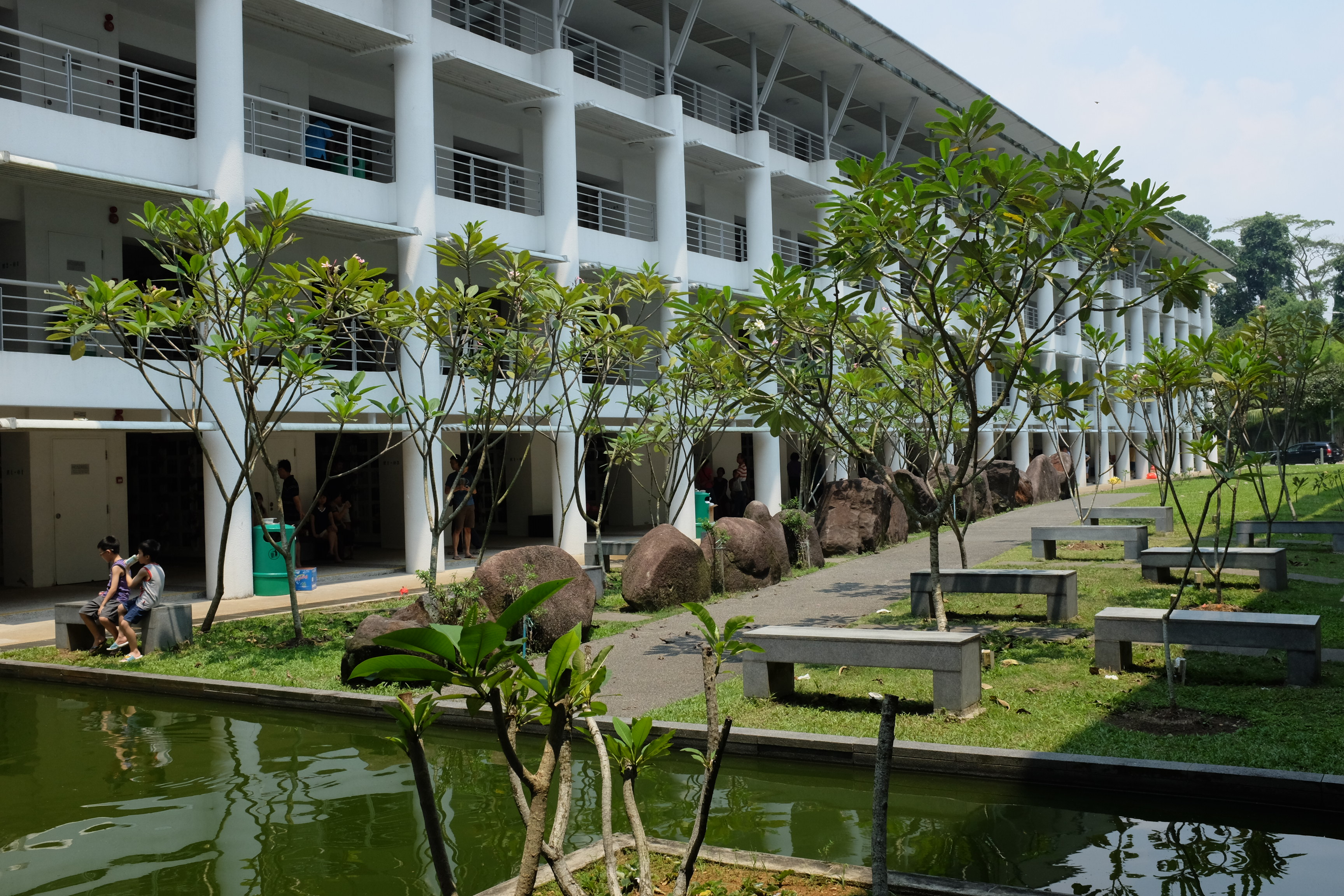

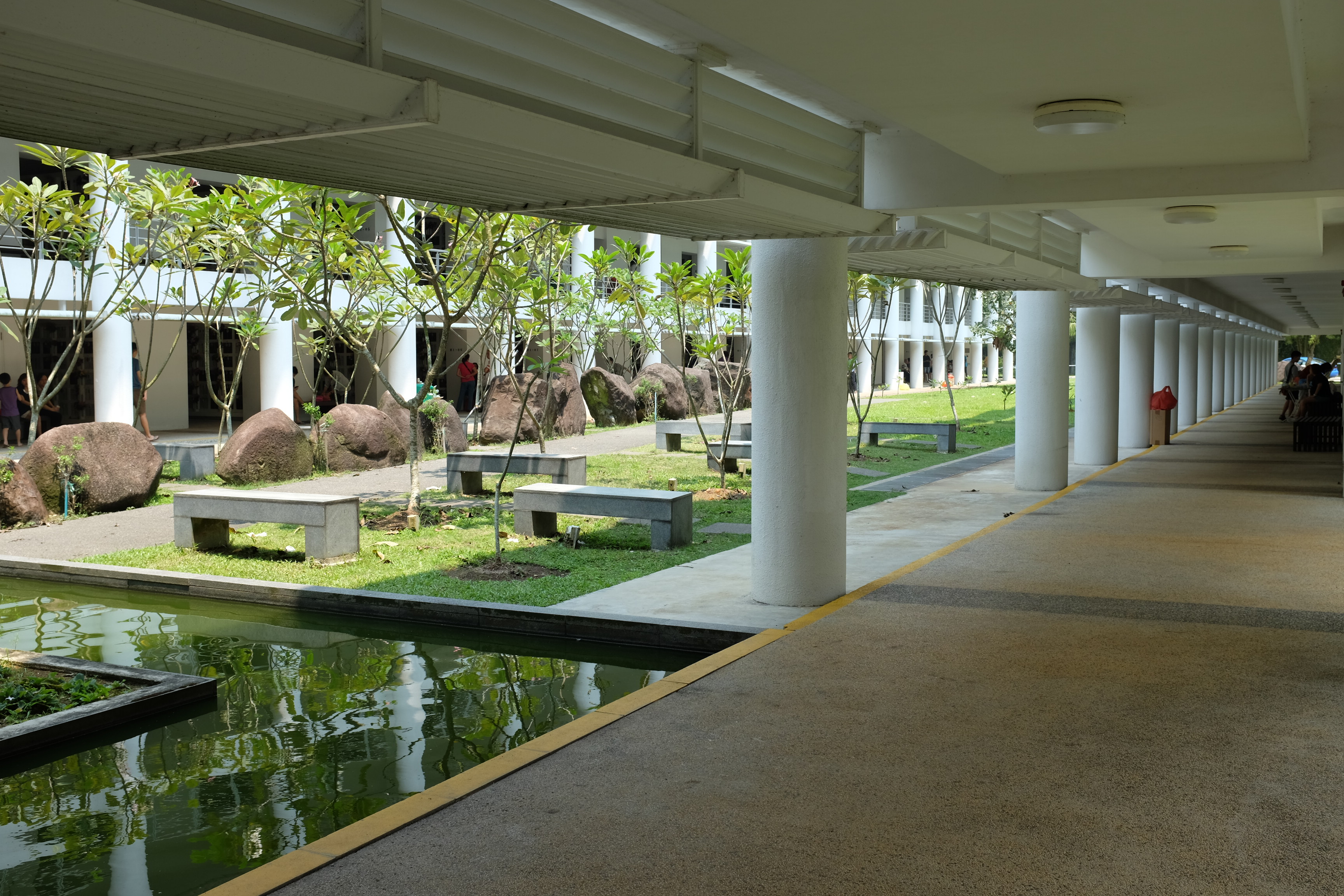

== See also ==
Other non-government crematoria and columbarium in Singapore include:

- Kong Meng San Phor Kark See Monastery
- Kranji State Cemetery – traditional burial options for notable persons in Singapore
- Kwong Wai Siew Peck San Theng – Chinese clan-based non-government columbarium
