= Singapore–South Korea relations =

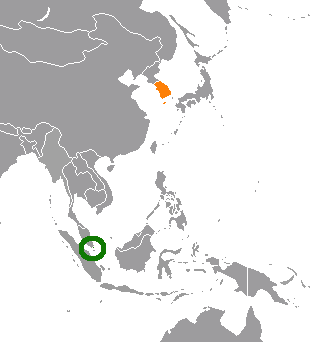
- Singapore: South Korea

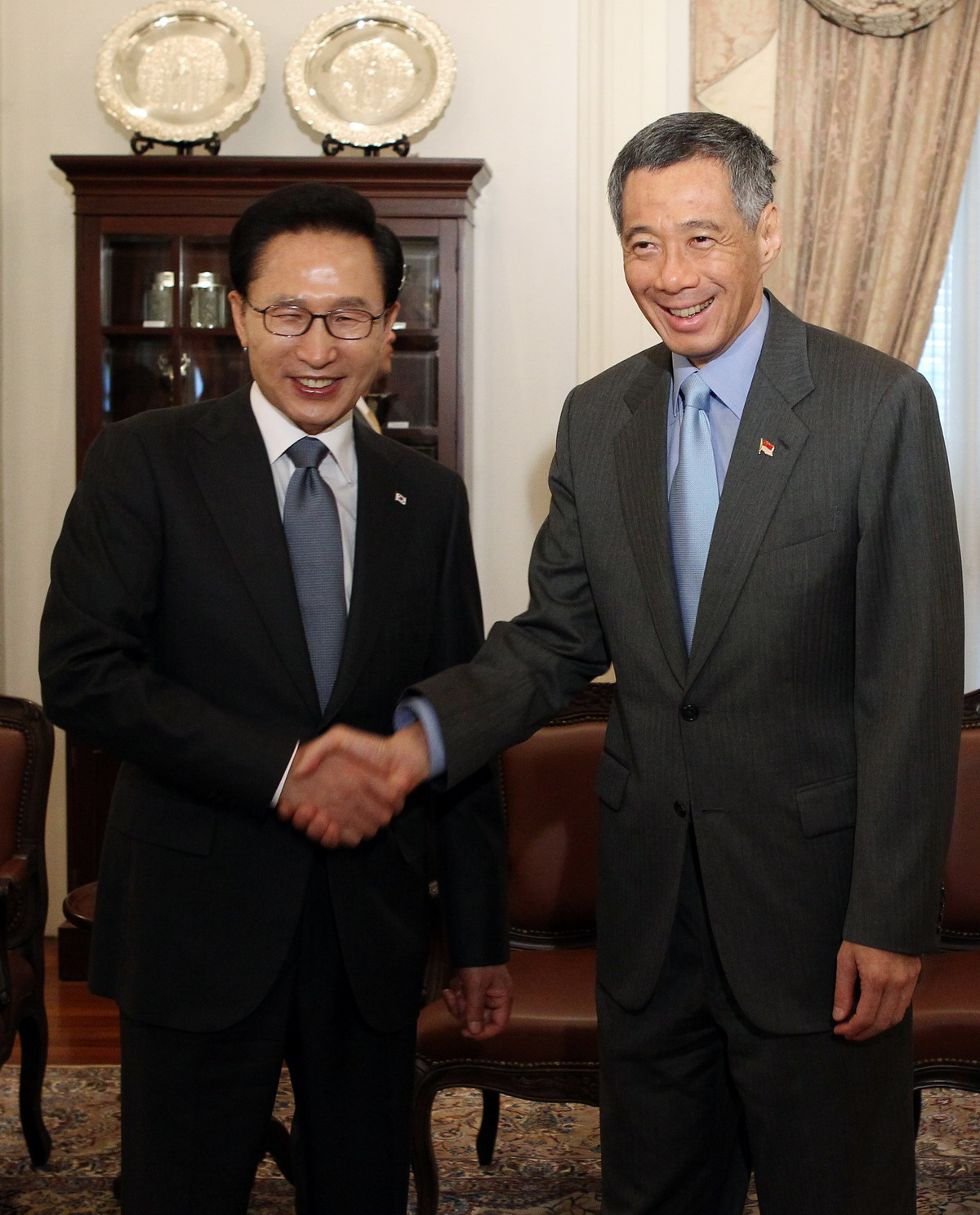
Lee Myung-bak, the President of South Korea held a summit talk with Lee Hsien Loong, the Prime Minister of Singapore on 5 June 2010.

Relations between the Republic of Singapore and the Republic of Korea (South Korea) started when a trade mission from South Korea visited the Colony of Singapore in 1950. The two countries established formal diplomatic relations in 1975, but South Korea established a trade office and a consulate-general, and sent a special envoy to visit Singapore before that. Both countries are the only two United Nations members in the Four Asian Tigers. In 2014, South Korea was the fourth-largest import source of Singapore.

== History ==
The earliest contact between Singapore and South Korea was dated to April 1950, when South Korean trade delegation paid a 5-day visit to Singapore. South Korea then established a Korea Trade Centre in Singapore in 1964. After Singapore's independence in 1965, the two countries established a fishing venture in 1967. In August 1969, Han Pyo-wook, the Ambassador of South Korea to Thailand, visited Singapore as the special envoy of Park Chung-hee, the President of South Korea, becoming the first official contact between the two countries. During his visit, Han met S. Rajaratnam, the Minister for Foreign Affairs of Singapore and handed a "special message" to Yusof Ishak, the President of Singapore. Some political observers believed that the visit of Han was a "counterbalance" to the visit of a North Korean special envoy team in the previous month.

In 1971, South Korea and Singapore established consular relations by renaming the Korea Trade Centre to a consulate-general. The two countries established formal diplomatic relations in 1975. In 1979, Lee Kuan Yew became the first Prime Minister of Singapore to visit South Korea. The two countries started regular ministerial meetings in the same year. In 1981, Chun Doo-hwan, the President of South Korea paid a state visit to Singapore, making him the first President of South Korea to do so. In 2002, S. R. Nathan became the first President of Singapore to visit South Korea.

In 2005, Lim Hng Kiang, the Minister for Trade and Industry of Singapore and Ban Ki-moon, the Minister of Foreign Affairs and Trade of South Korea signed the Korea-Singapore Free Trade Agreement. It was valid in 2006.

When Lee Kuan Yew died in 2015, Park Geun-hye, then-President of South Korea, visited Singapore to attend his funeral.

Singapore and South Korea will celebrate 50 years of diplomatic relations in 2025.

== Trade relations ==
According to the data from The Observatory of Economic Complexity, the exported value from Singapore to South Korea increased between 1995 and 2014. It reached a peak of 12 billion US dollars in 2014. Singapore mainly exported machines and chemical products to South Korea. The proportion of refined oil in the exported value had increased since 2007.

The exported value from South Korea to Singapore was between 4 billion and 6 billion US dollars from 1995 to 2003, and it started increasing since 2004. It reached a peak of 26 billion US dollars in 2012. South Korea mainly exported machines and chemical products to Singapore. The proportion of refined oil in the exported value had increased since 2003, while the proportion of commercial vessels in the exported value had increased after that.

== Cultural relations ==
The South Korean embassy donated a sculpture Conversation – From Nature in 2011 to the Singapore Botanic Gardens. The sculpture is an engraving of the two nations' national flowers – South Korea's Rose of Sharon (Hibiscus syriacus) and Singapore's Vanda Miss Joaquim (Papilionanthe Miss Joaquim), which sprung from a common centre. This is intended to reflect the close friendship between the two countries, with the circular centre of the flowers representing not only the two countries' communications but also the conversations mankind has with nature.

Lawrence Wong, Singapore's Acting Minister for Culture, Community and Youth, visited South Korea twice in 2013 for the launch of the exhibition entitled “The Peranakan World: Cross-cultural Art from Singapore and the Straits” at the National Museum of Korea and attending the inaugural ROK-Southeast Asia Culture Ministers’ Meeting held in Gwangju, separately.

On 12 November 2014, Singapore organized the first ASEAN K-pop Dance Cover Festival.

The film Ajoomma was a joint cooperation between the film industries of South Korea and Singapore; the film depicts the Korean Wave in Singapore, which was well popularised by My Too Perfect Sons, When Life Gives You Tangerines, My Husband Got a Family, High Kick! and High Kick Through the Roof. The film was nominated for Best Leading Actress at the 59th Golden Horse Awards.

== Resident diplomatic missions ==
of Singapore in South Korea

- Seoul (Embassy)

of South Korea in Singapore

- Singapore (Embassy)

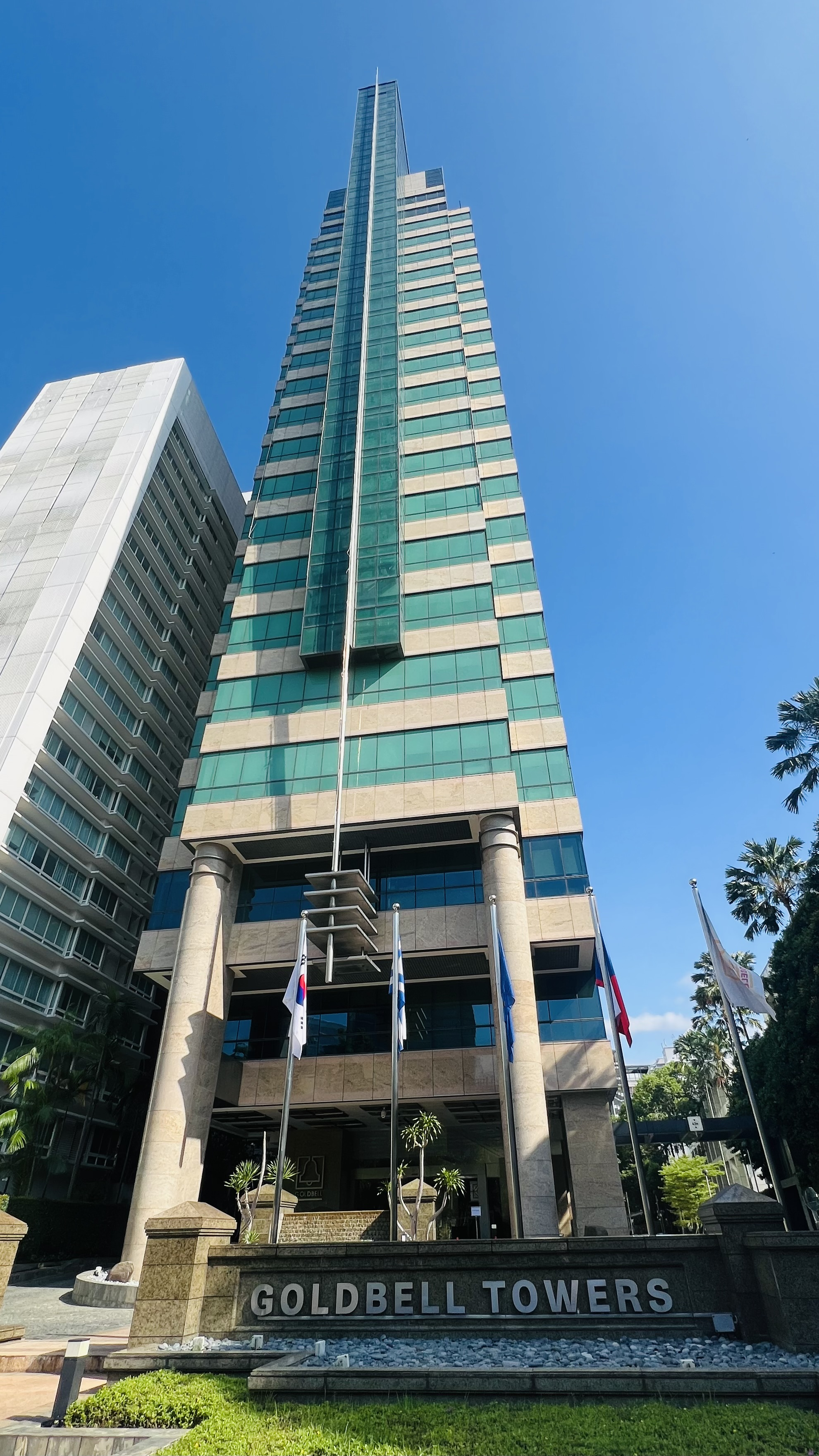
Building hosting the Embassy of South Korea in Singapore

== See also ==
- Foreign relations of Singapore
- Foreign relations of South Korea
- North Korea-Singapore relations
