= List of ambassadors of Singapore to Japan =

Singapore Ambassador to Japan
- Incumbent; Ong Eng Chuan since 2023
- Inaugural holder: Ang Kok Peng
- Formation: 26 April 1966; 60 years ago

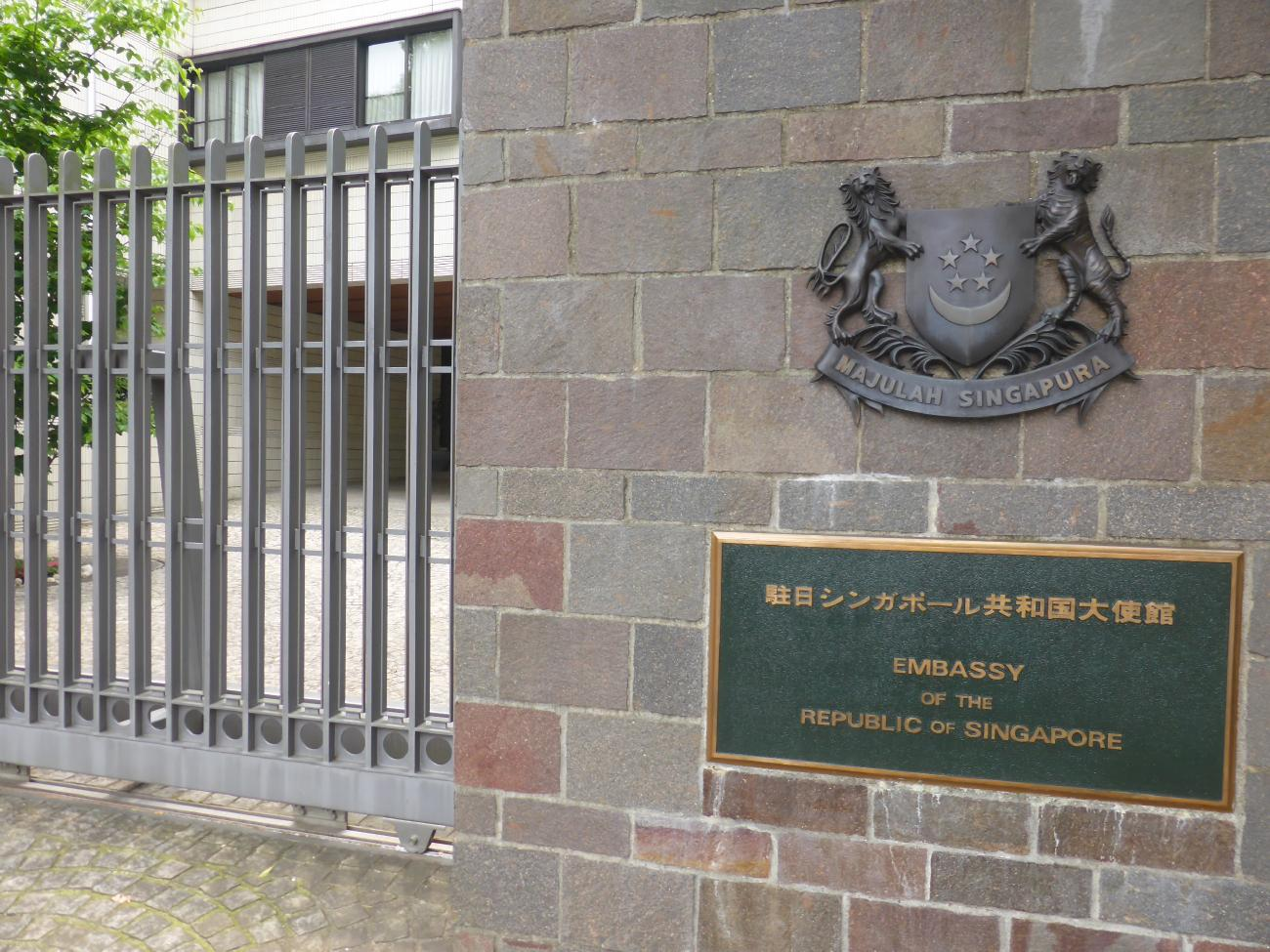
Embassy of Singapore in Tokyo

This is a list of ambassadors of Singapore to the Japan

Ambassador	Tenure
Ang Kok Peng	1968 – 1971
Loy Keng Foo	1971 – 1972
Wee Mon Cheng	1973 – 1980
Wee Kim Wee	1980 – 1984
Lee Khoon Choy	1984 – 1988
Cheng Tong Fatt	1988 – 1991
Lim Chin Beng	1991 – 1997
Chew Tai Soo	1998 – 2004
Tan Chin Tiong	2004 – 2012
Chin Siat Yoon	2012 – 2017
Lui Tuck Yew	2017 – 2019
Peter Tan Hai Chuan	2019 – 2023
Ong Eng Chuan	2023 – incumbent

== See also ==
- Japan–Singapore relations
