= Israel–Singapore relations =

Bilateral relations between Israel and Singapore

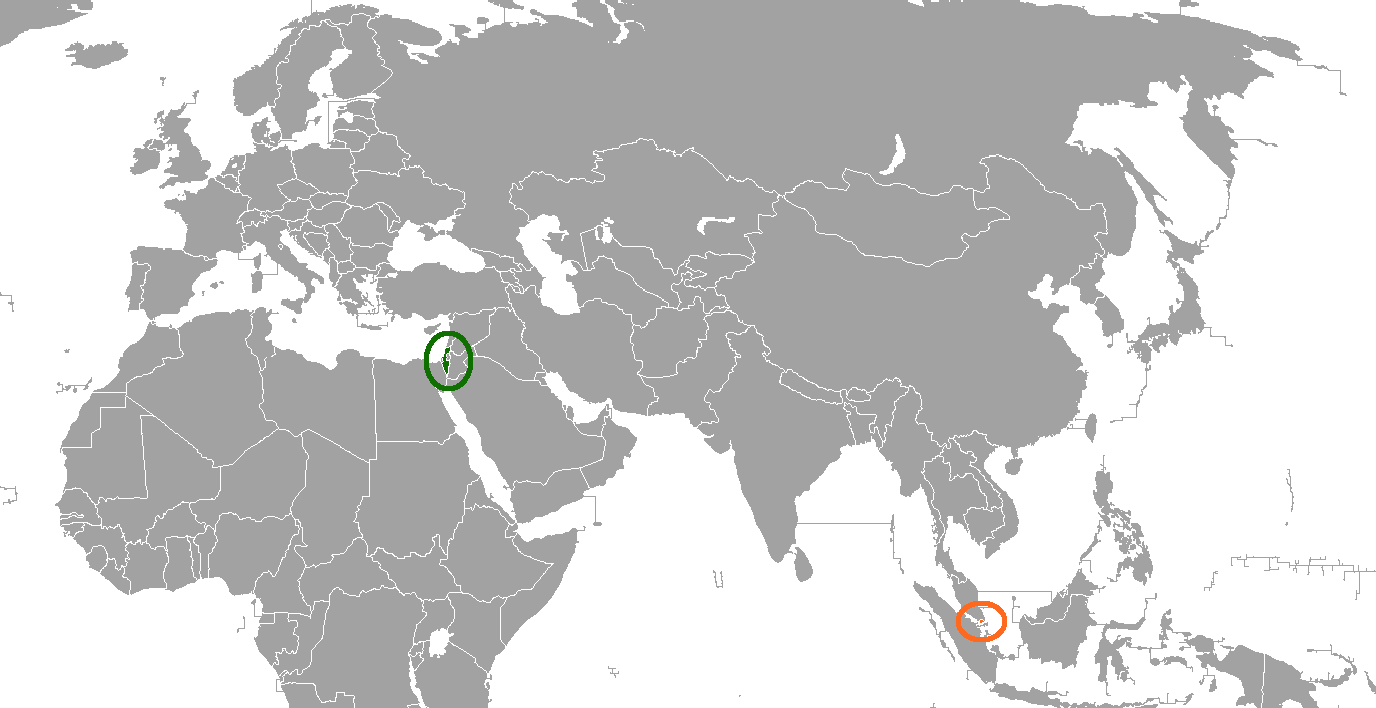
- Israel: Singapore

Diplomatic mission
- Embassy of Israel in Singapore: Embassy of the Republic of Singapore, Tel Aviv

Envoy
- Ambassador Yahel Vilan: Ambassador Ian Mak Jung-I

Israel–Singapore relations (Hebrew: יחסי ישראל-סינגפור) refers to the bilateral relations between the State of Israel and the Republic of Singapore. Relations between the two countries have been extremely cordial and friendly for more than half a century.

The countries formally established diplomatic relations in May 1969, although unofficial and discreet relations had been in place before that in the form of military cooperation. The two nations are known to share a special relationship and enjoy an extensive security partnership. Israeli and Singaporean arms industries such as Israel Aerospace Industries and ST Engineering engage in joint projects and there is a large volume of military trade between the two countries.

Israel has an embassy in the Tanglin district of Singapore. Singapore was previously represented by a non–resident ambassador based in Singapore and had an honorary consulate in Tel Aviv. On 21 March 2022, Singapore and Israel announced that Singapore would be establishing an embassy in Tel Aviv, which began operations later that year. The current Israeli Ambassador to Singapore is Yahel Vilan and the current Singaporean Ambassador to Israel is Ian Mak Jung-I.

== History ==
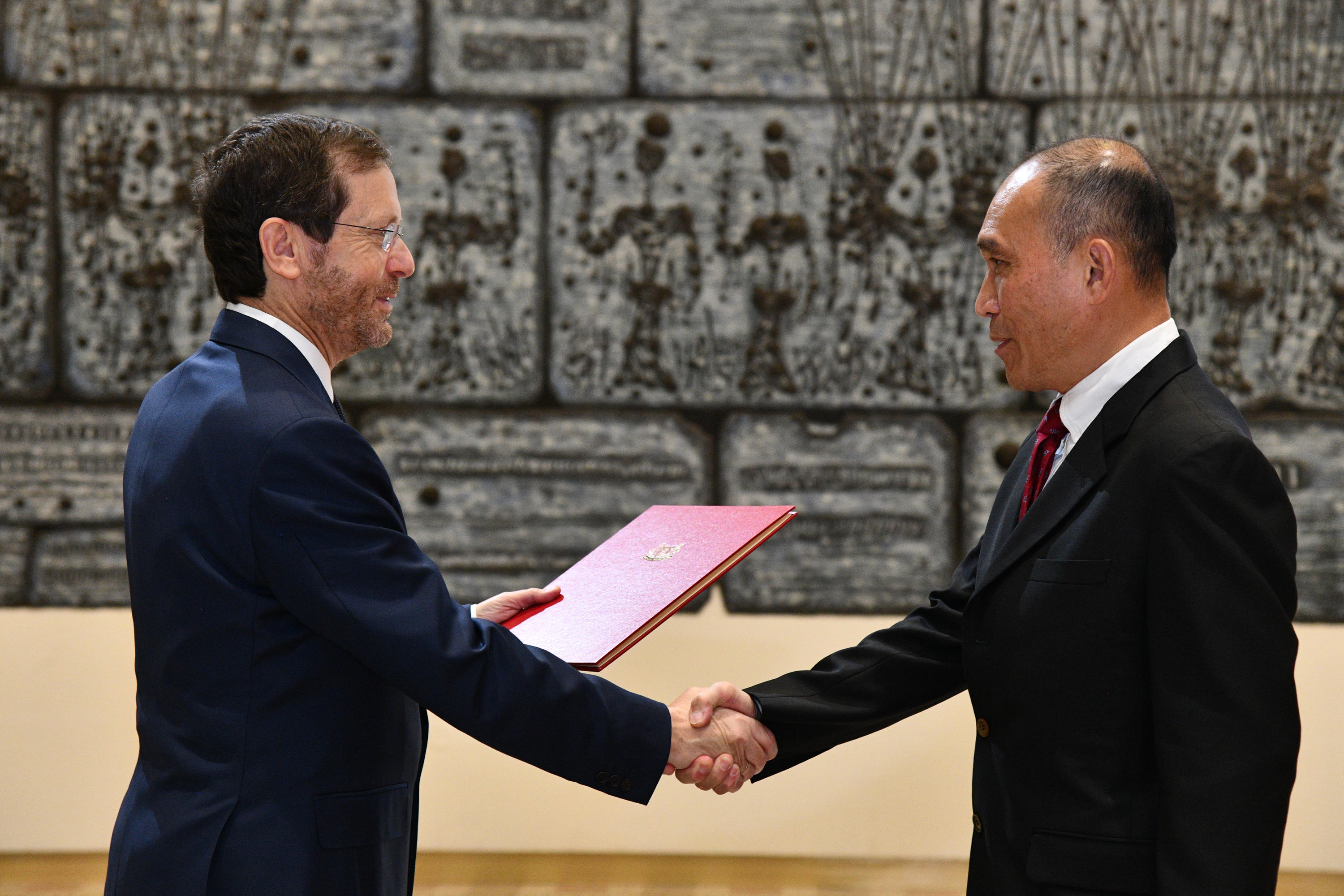
Lim Chuan Poh presenting his credentials to President of Israel Isaac Herzog in April 2022 in Israel as Singapore's Ambassador

Singapore was separated from Malaysia on 9 August 1965, becoming a sovereign country. With an independent foreign policy, Singapore would establish full diplomatic relations with Israel. However, Singapore kept its relationship with Israel on a low profile in its initial years to avoid garnering a negative response from its Muslim-majority neighbours Malaysia and Indonesia, which maintain significant animosity towards Israel stemming from the Arab-Israeli conflict and continue to not have diplomatic recognition with it. Kawin Wilairat in his 1975 essay on Singaporean's foreign policy 10 years since its independence points out that Singapore's first prime minister Lee Kuan Yew often made remarks on Singapore's supposed precarious position surrounding its Muslim neighbours like Malaysia and Indonesia as an "Israel in a Malay-Muslim sea".

To protect the newly independent nation from external threats, the Singaporean government decided to model its armed forces, the Singapore Armed Forces (SAF), including its conscription system, after the Israel Defense Forces (IDF). From 1966, Israeli military advisers were brought in to assist in setting up and training the Singaporean military. Israel also supplied Singapore with military hardware including tanks and missiles. In 1968, an Israeli trade office was established in Singapore and was subsequently upgraded to embassy status that same year. Such collaborations had stirred suspicions in high ranking army generals in the region like Sumitro.

In April 1986, the Singapore Minister for Foreign Affairs S. Dhanabalan visited Israel. In return, the Israeli President Chaim Herzog visited Singapore from 18 to 19 November 1986. Herzog's visit triggered angry protests from both the Malaysian and Indonesian governments; Malaysian newspapers even denounced the visit as affirming the image of Singapore as a "second Israel". Brunei had also issued a similar protest. The Malaysian government threatened to stop Singapore's water supply across the Johor–Singapore Causeway, which the latter had heavily relied on prior to the introduction of NEWater and the construction of desalination plants. Despite the protests and threats, Singapore refused to be intimidated and Israel–Singapore trade relations continued to expand. By 1991, Israel's trade with Singapore totalled US$79 million in exports and US$43 million in imports. According to Jacob Abadi, Singapore sought to project an image of impartiality towards the Arab–Israeli conflict. While maintaining defense and economic relations with Israel, Singapore endorsed UN Resolutions 242 and 338 in order to balance relations with its Muslim neighbors and the Arab world.

Israeli Prime Minister Benjamin Netanyahu and his wife Sara visited Singapore In February 2017. He was hosted by the Singaporean Prime Minister Lee Hsien Loong. During the visit, Prime Minister Lee spoke in favour of Singapore's long-standing position of a two-state solution to the Israeli–Palestinian conflict. Unlike the 1986 state visit, Netanyahu's presence did not attract much opposition from Malaysia and Indonesia. Netanyahu also met with members of the Singaporean Jewish community and visited Maghain Aboth Synagogue.

In March 2022, Singapore announced that it would establish an embassy in Tel Aviv, 53 years after the two nations first established diplomatic relations. Previously, Singapore was represented by a non–resident ambassador based in Singapore and had an honorary consulate in Tel Aviv. The embassy was established in October.

== Agreements ==
In 2005, the two countries signed a pact to ease the flow of goods and investments between the two countries during a visit to Israel by Singapore Senior Minister Goh Chok Tong with members of the Israeli Cabinet as well as meeting Israeli Prime Minister Ariel Sharon. In February 2017, Prime Minister Benjamin Netanyahu became the first Israeli prime minister to visit Singapore in 30 years.

Singapore does not recognise the State of Palestine, although the country has always supported a negotiated two-state solution. Singapore was also one of 41 countries that abstained from voting on the Resolution 67/19 on "Status of Palestine in the United Nations" by the United Nations General Assembly on 29 November 2012 which granted Non-Member Observer State status to Palestine. In explaining the reasons for Singapore's abstention, Senior Minister of State Masagos Zulkifli stated that Singapore believes "that only a negotiated settlement consistent with UN Security Council Resolution 242 can provide the basis for a viable, long term solution" and that "both parties have legitimate rights and shared responsibilities, and must be prepared to make compromises to achieve the larger good of a lasting peace".

== Cooperation ==
"We were relieved the Israelis were not defeated or our SAF would have lost confidence."

— Prime Minister of Singapore Lee Kuan Yew after Israel's victory in the Six-Day War

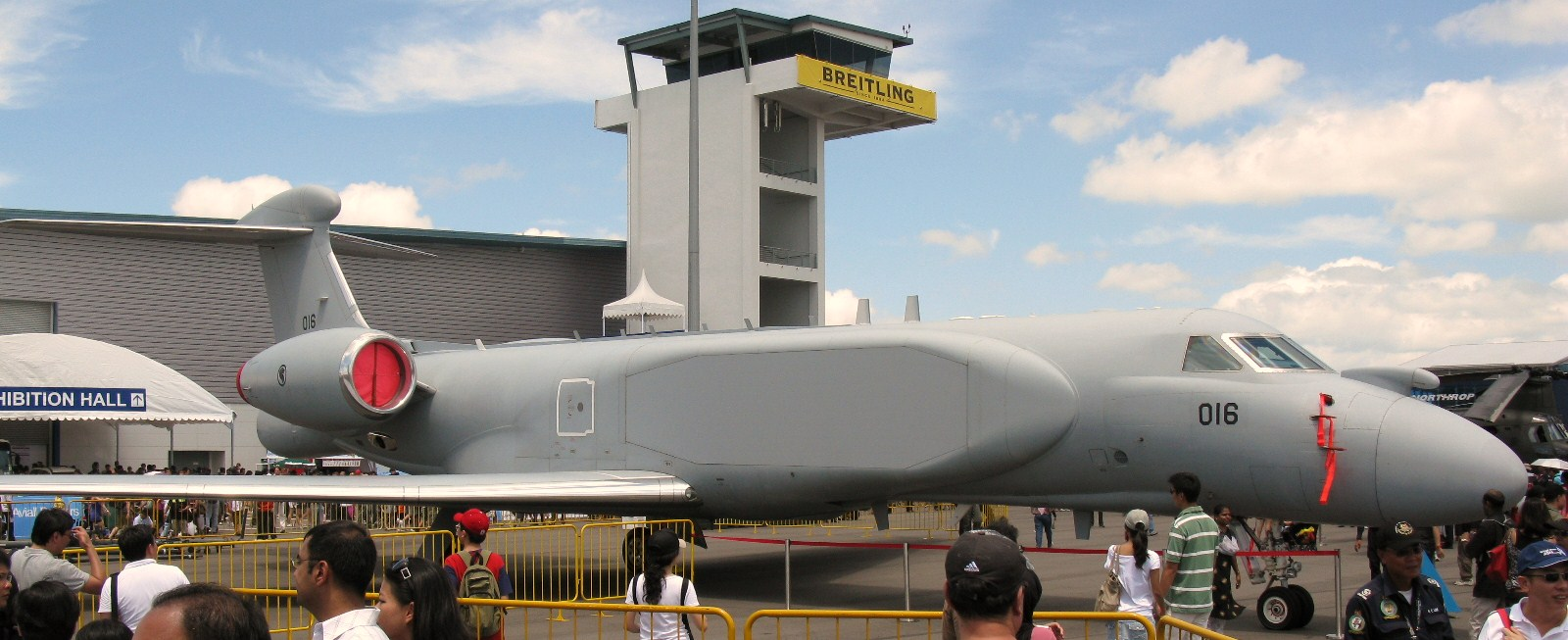
A Republic of Singapore Air Force G550 Conformal Airborne Early Warning (CAEW) aircraft. Singapore purchased four G550s from Israel Aerospace Industries fitted with the EL/W-2085 sensor package in 2007. They were delivered in late 2008 and were fully operational by late 2010.

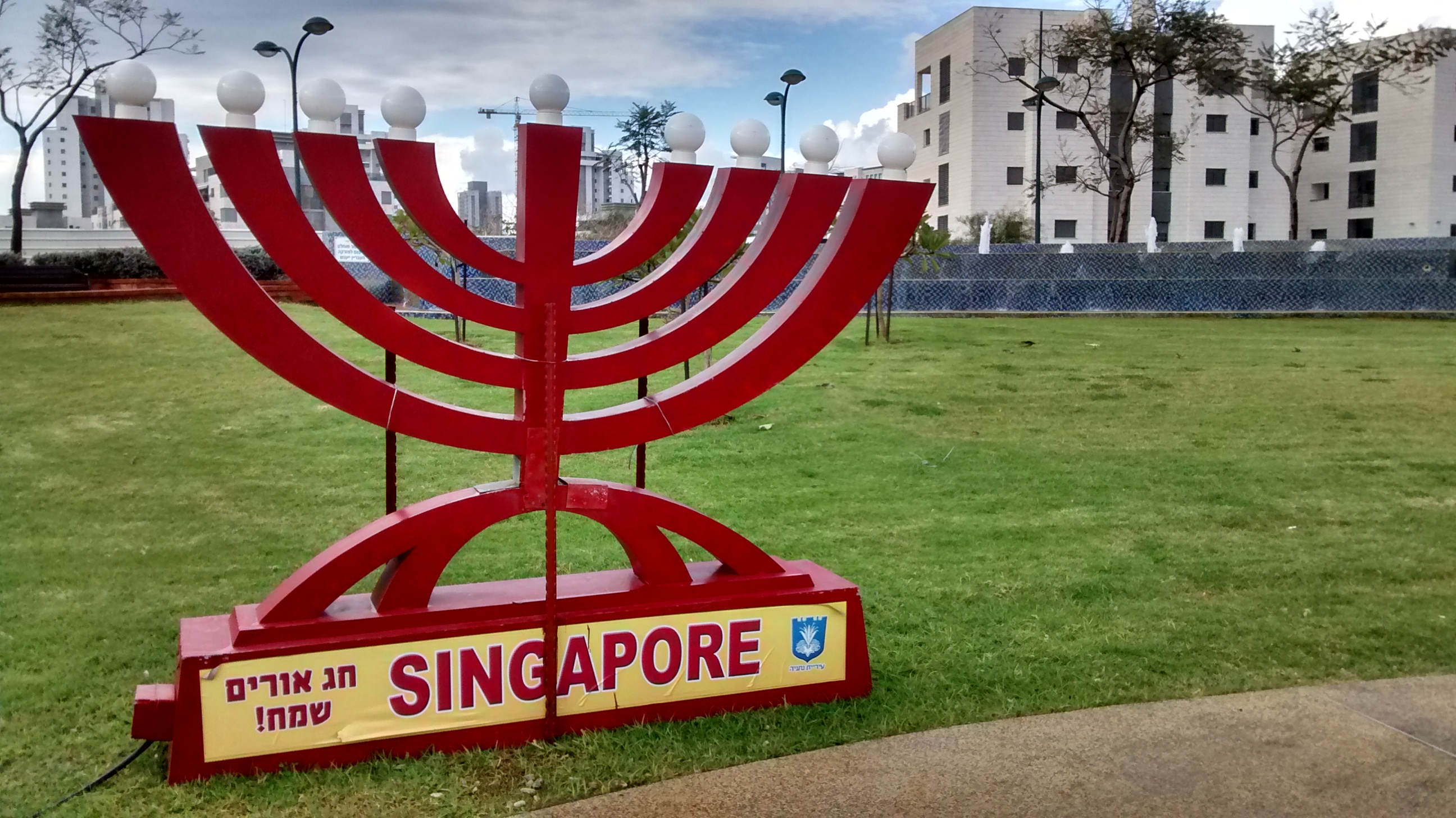
A Hanukiah in Netanya, Israel, honoring Singapore

=== Business and trade ===
In 1990, the Singapore–Israel Chamber of Commerce first commenced operations.

In 2013, Singapore–Israel trade totaled S$1.956 billion, a 24.6% jump year-on-year from 2012, according to figures from the Embassy of Israel in Singapore and IE Singapore. Singapore is a net importer from Israel, and Israel exports mostly electrical equipment to Singapore, while Singapore exports mostly machinery and computer equipment to Israel.

In August 2023, Israeli Economy Minister Nir Barkat led a delegation to Singapore aimed at boosting mutual cooperation in the fields of education, medical research, tourism, water scarcity solutions, support for entrepreneurs, and technological innovation. Trade between the two countries totalled $3.8 billion, up 67% compared to the previous year.

=== Military ===
In January 1968, before diplomatic relations were established, Singapore made an agreement to purchase 72 surplus AMX-13 tanks from Israel. By the 1980s, Singapore had acquired over 350 of these tanks.

During the formative years of the Singapore Armed Forces (SAF) in the late 1960s, Singapore sought advice and consultation from experienced militaries to form a credible military post-independence. Israel responded and provided doctrine and training development. Due to sensitivities in a Muslim-dominant region, Singapore kept the co-operation low-profile.

Over the years, Israel has continued to advise Singapore on an array of military topics, ranging from night operations to aviation psychology. The defence and intelligence establishments of both countries conduct routine exchanges of information, and a small number of IDF officers serve in staff appointments within the Singapore Ministry of Defence (MINDEF).

Today, the two countries operate many of the same weapon platforms, including early warning aircraft, anti-tank and anti-aircraft missiles, aircraft and surveillance technologies. This is particularly true with respect to aerial systems (as the ground terrain of the two countries is very different). As such, the primary aircraft type make up of the Israeli and Singaporean air forces is nearly identical, with both countries operating the F-15E Strike Eagle, F-16 Fighting Falcon, F-35 Lightning II, G550 airborne early warning aircraft, C-130 Hercules, AH-64 Apache, and M-346 Master advanced training aircraft. They also operate similar submarines—larger variants of the German Type 212 submarine (Dolphin-class submarine and Invincible-class submarine respectively).

== Israeli–Palestinian conflict ==
=== 2009–2014 ===
Since the 2000s, the Singapore Government has expressed concerns over Palestinian rocket attacks on Israel. In January 2009, the Singapore Ministry of Foreign Affairs (MFA) said of the Gaza War, "This is an extremely disturbing development," that "It can only exacerbate the already grave humanitarian situation." Following the ceasefire, the Singapore Ministry of Foreign Affairs called it a "positive development" but remained "deeply concerned over the humanitarian situation in Gaza and urge all sides to take urgent steps to address the situation".

In July 2014, the Singapore Ministry of Foreign Affairs also issued a statement on the murder of three Israeli teenagers in the West Bank. The statement said: "Singapore strongly condemns the killing of the three Israeli teenagers, who were first abducted on 12 June 2014. We convey our deepest condolences to the families of the victims and the people of Israel. Perpetrators of such heinous crimes must be swiftly brought to justice". During the subsequent 2014 Gaza war, Singapore Minister for Foreign Affairs K. Shanmugam said the Palestinian militant organisation Hamas has "deliberately used civilians as [human] shields" and was responsible for rejecting the Egyptian proposal on 15 July 2014 for a ceasefire. In the same speech to the Singapore Parliament, he also said that Hamas had been consistently launching rocket attacks at Israel, numbering over 2,000 missiles at one point, and this was what prompted the start of Israel's operation to destroy these rocket-launching sites, the smuggling tunnels and the munitions stockpiles to prevent attacks on Israel.

=== Gaza war (2023–present) ===
During the Gaza war that began following the 2023 October 7 attacks, Singapore condemned Hamas' rocket and terror attack on Israel, with Prime Minister Lee Hsien Loong and President Tharman Shanmugaratnam writing condolence letters of support to their respective counterparts Prime Minister Benjamin Netanyahu and President Isaac Herzog on 8 October. Singapore's home affairs minister K. Shanmugam stated a few days later on 12 October that such atrocities [by Hamas] "cannot be justified by any rationale" and that "it is possible to deeply sympathise with the plight of the Palestinians, and yet still unequivocally condemn the terrorist attacks carried out in Israel." On 16 October, it was announced that both the government and the Singapore Red Cross (SRC) would be contributing over half a million dollars in humanitarian aid to support relief efforts.

The Nation reported in 2024 that Singapore's stance on the conflict was shifting "slowly and incrementally". In December 2023, Singapore voted in favour of a United Nations resolution that called for an immediate ceasefire in the war.

In February 2024, Singapore's Minister of Foreign Affairs Vivian Balakrishnan said that Israel's military actions had "gone too far." He said that breaking off diplomatic ties with Israel would not be helpful for Palestinians, noting that the five permanent members of the United Nations Security Council and countries such as Jordan and Egypt had not severed ties with Israel.

In March 2024, Shanmugam ordered the Israeli embassy in Singapore to take down a social media post stating that the word "Palestine" was not included in the Quran. He said the post was "completely unacceptable" and risked undermining Singapore's "safety, security and harmony", and condemned it as "an astonishing attempt to rewrite history".

On 10 May 2024, Singapore was one of the 143 nations that supported a United Nations resolution supporting Palestine's admittance as a member of the international organization with the statement that the decision was made after "serious and careful consideration".

In July 2025, Singapore's Ministry of Foreign Affairs publicly condemned Israel for the first time, referring to Israel's denial of humanitarian aid to Gaza as "a violation of international humanitarian law" and unconscionable. In the same month, Kevin Cheok, the Deputy Secretary (Asia‑Pacific) at Singapore's Ministry of Foreign Affairs, announced at a United Nations conference in New York City that Singapore is "prepared in principle" to recognise Palestine as a state, emphasising that such recognition should promote peace through a negotiated two-state solution.

A second round of condemnation occurred after Israel launched an air strike in Doha on 10 September 2025, with Singapore calling the attack a violation of Qatar's sovereignty and describing it as "egregious and dangerous."

On 21 November 2025, Singapore imposed financial sanctions and barred entry to four Israeli settlers who had been implicated in violence and incitement against Palestinians in the West Bank. The Singaporean Foreign Ministry also reiterated its opposition to settlement expansion in the West Bank. Singapore urged Israel to suspend expansion plans in the E1 area in August 2026, cautioning that fracturing the West Bank would "severely undermine" the two-state solution.

== See also ==
- History of the Jews in Singapore
- International recognition of Israel
