= United Chinese Library =

Library in Singapore

Coordinates: 1°16′43″N 103°50′25″E

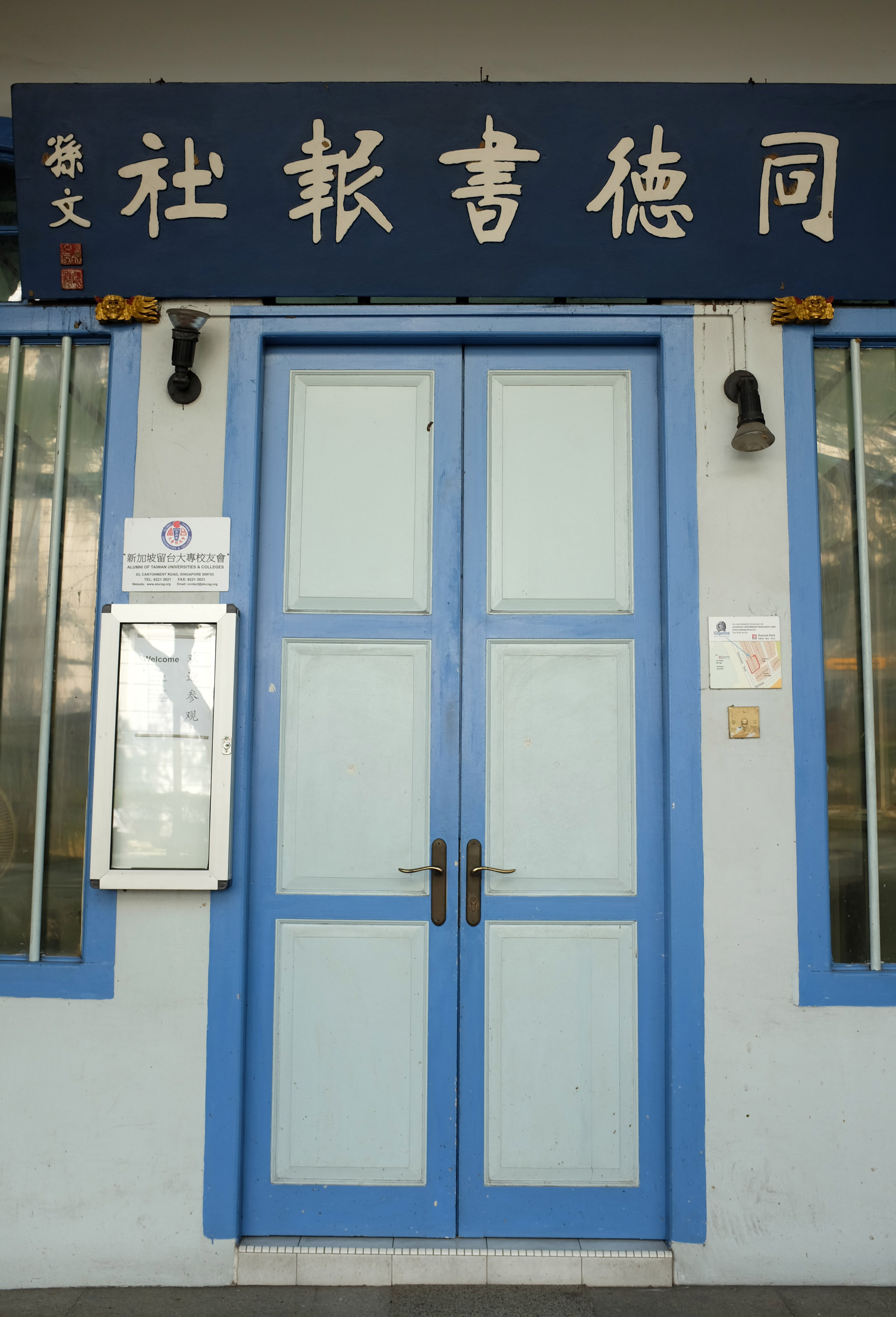
Entrance of the United Chinese Library at 53 Cantonment Road

The United Chinese Library (simplified Chinese: 同德书报社; traditional Chinese: 同德書報社; pinyin: Tóngdé Shūbào Shè) is a private library in Singapore, focusing on Chinese culture and literature. The library was formally established on 8 August 1910, on the instigation of Sun Yat-sen, who wished to use it to promote the republican revolution in China.

Its Chinese name has been spelled in romanised form as Thong Tek Che Poh Soh (following Teochew pronunciation) or Tong De Shu Bao She (Mandarin in Pinyin romanisation).

== History ==
After a visit from Sun Yat-sen to Singapore, a branch of the Tongmenghui organisation was founded there in 1906 to organise support among overseas Chinese for the Republican cause in China. Sun encouraged them to start a library to promote revolutionary ideas, such as his Three Principles of the People, and to recruit youth members for the Tongmenghui and Kuomintang. The library was opened in 1910 and formally registered as a society in 1911. Its founders were Tongmenghui leaders such as Lim Nee Soon and Teo Eng Hock. It was affiliated with the Tongmenghui and allied political and social organisations. In addition to serving as a library open to the Chinese-reading public, with over 50,000 books in its collection by 1941, the library organised classes and youth activities, supported Chinese schools, and promoted the modernisation of Chinese marriage and funeral rites. In 1922, the Library was forced by the Registrar of Societies to adopt a new constitution stating that it would not interfere with politics, because the British colonial government was concerned about its overt ties to the Kuomintang.

There were over a hundred Chinese libraries or "reading rooms" like the United Chinese Library and the Sin Chew Reading Room (founded 1903) in Singapore and Malaya, most of which were set up by the Tongmenghui or Kuomintang, although a number were operated by the Malayan Communist Party from the 1930s on. The United Chinese Library is the only surviving one of its kind in Singapore.

In the immediate aftermath of World War II, members of the United Chinese Library helped to maintain law and order. They also helped organise the funeral of war hero Lim Bo Seng. The communist victory in the Chinese Civil War and the independence of Malaysia and Singapore caused many overseas Chinese to change how they viewed their national identity and ties to China. The library has since focused on its role as a cultural organisation.

== Location ==
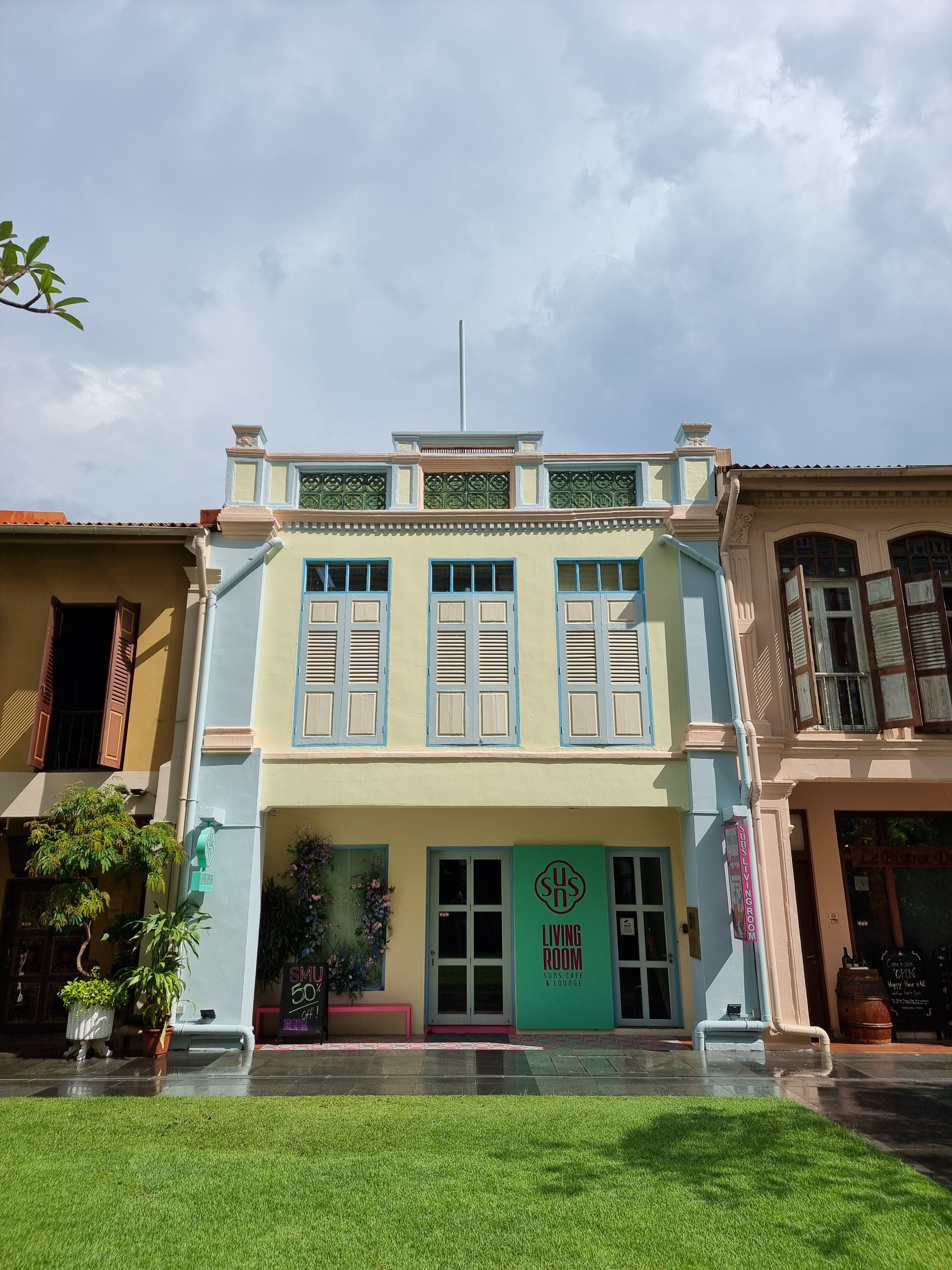
Shophouse at 51 Armenian Street that housed the United Chinese Library from 1911 to 1987. Pictured in 2025.

The library was first located at North Boat Quay, before moving to 51 Armenian Street on 25 November 1911. Since 15 January 1987 it has occupied a two-storey shophouse at 53 Cantonment Road in Singapore's Chinatown district. The Armenian Street location has been designated a heritage site by the National Heritage Board. The signboard over the library's entrance was contributed by Sun Yat-sen in 1917 and features his calligraphy. During World War II, it was hidden from the occupying Japanese by being used face-down as a chopping block in a market.
