= Presidential elections in Singapore =

Process of electing the president of Singapore

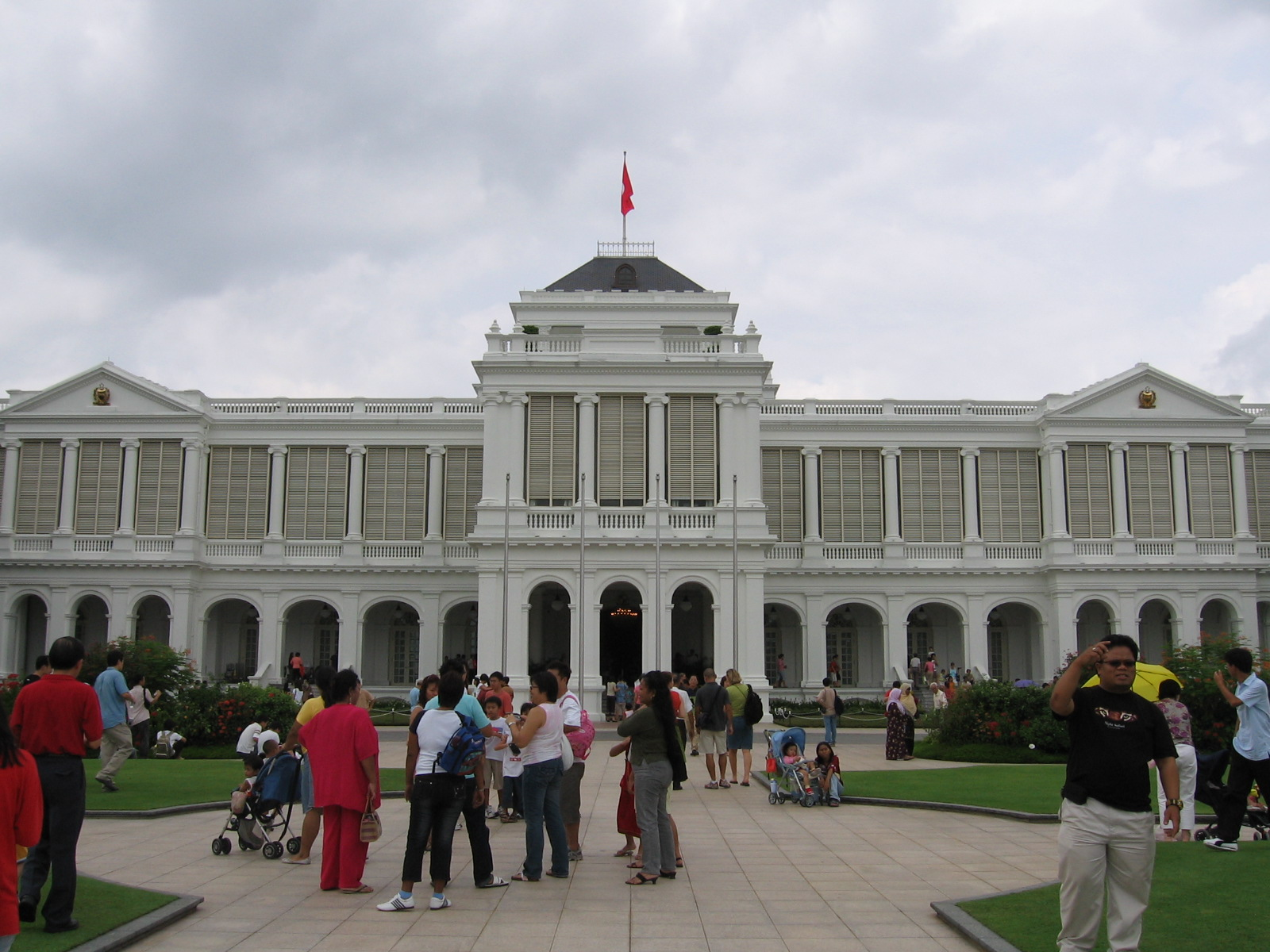
The Istana, the official residence of the president of Singapore, photographed in January 2006

Presidential elections in Singapore, in which the president of Singapore is directly elected by a popular vote, were introduced after a constitutional amendment made in 1991. Potential candidates for office must meet stringent qualifications set out in the Constitution. Certificates of Eligibility are issued by the Presidential Elections Committee (PEC). In particular, the PEC must assess that they are persons of integrity, good character and reputation; and if they have not previously held certain key government appointments or were the chief executives of profitable companies with shareholders' equity of an average of S$500 million for the most recent three years in that office, they must demonstrate to the PEC that they held a position of comparable seniority and responsibility in the public or private sector that has given them experience and ability in administering and managing financial affairs.

The general strictness of the qualifications has resulted in three out of the six presidential elections being walkovers, as presidents S. R. Nathan and Halimah Yacob were the sole candidates to receive a Certificate of Eligibility from the PEC in the 1999, 2005 and 2017 presidential elections. The stringent criteria, the transparency of the PEC's decision-making process and the practice of political parties endorsing candidates have drawn criticism.

Another constitutional amendment was made in 2016, that allows for a presidential election to be reserved for an ethnic community in Singapore if no one from that community had been president for the previous five presidential terms. The ethnic communities in Singapore are categorised into: the Chinese community; the Malay community; and the Indian or other minority communities. Candidates are required to satisfy the usual qualification criteria. The 2017 presidential election was the first reserved election, and was reserved for the Malay community.

The office of president falls vacant upon the expiry of the incumbent's six-year term or if the president is for some reason unable to complete his or her term; for example, due to death (Yusof Ishak and Benjamin Sheares), resignation (Devan Nair) or removal from office for misconduct or mental or physical infirmity, which has yet to happen. If the office of president becomes vacant before the incumbent's term expires, a poll for an election must be held within six months. In other cases, an election can take place any time from three months before the expiry of the incumbent's term of office.

The procedure for elections is laid out in the Presidential Elections Act (Cap. 240A, 2011 Rev. Ed.). The process begins when the prime minister issues a writ of election to the returning officer specifying the date and place of nomination day. Potential candidates must obtain Certificates of Eligibility from the PEC, in most cases community certificates from the Community Committee, and political donation certificates from the Registrar of Political Donations stating that they have complied with the Political Donations Act (Cap. 236, 2001 Rev. Ed.). These documents must be submitted together with a nomination paper to the returning officer on nomination day. In addition, by that day, potential candidates must pay a deposit to the returning officer. When only one candidate is nominated, that candidate is declared to have been elected president. Otherwise, the returning officer issues a notice of contested election specifying when polling day will be.

During the election period, a candidate may not spend more than $600,000 or 30 cents for each person on the electoral register, whichever is greater. Candidates may publish election advertising on the Internet, and participate in scheduled television and radio broadcasts. Permits must be obtained to hold election meetings and display posters and banners. A number of acts are unlawful, including bribery, dissuading electors from voting, making false statements about candidates, treating and undue influence. It is also a criminal offence to publish election surveys, and exit polls on polling day before the polls have closed. Legal changes introduced in 2010 made the eve of polling day a "cooling-off day"—campaigning must not take place on that day or on polling day itself.

== The elected president scheme ==
The president of Singapore is the head of state of the Republic of Singapore. The president was originally indirectly elected by Parliament and had a largely ceremonial role. The Elected President scheme was instituted in 1991 through a constitutional amendment, which transformed the office of President into one directly elected by the people. The scheme conferred additional powers on the president that enabled them to act as a safeguard or "second key" over Singapore's rich financial reserves built up by the Government. Additionally, the president exercises a custodial role over the integrity of the public service with the power to veto public appointments and check against abuses of power by the government.

In practice, however, the president's role remains mostly ceremonial. In most cases, the Constitution requires the president to exercise his or her powers on the advice of the Cabinet or a minister acting under the Cabinet's general authority.

== Qualifications ==
The qualifications required for a person to be elected as president are set out in the Constitution of the Republic of Singapore and are as follows:

- Must be a citizen of Singapore.
- Must not be less than 45 years of age.
- Must appear in a current register of electors.
- Must be resident in Singapore at the date of his or her nomination for election and must have been so resident for periods amounting in the aggregate to not less than ten years prior to that date.
- Must not be subject to any of the following disqualifications:

(a) being and having been found or declared to be of unsound mind;
(b) being an undischarged bankrupt;
(c) holding an office of profit;
(d) having been nominated for election to Parliament or the office of President or having acted as election agent to a person so nominated, failing to lodge any return of election expenses required by law within the time and in the manner so required;
(e) having been convicted of an offence by a court in Singapore or elsewhere and sentenced to imprisonment for a term of not less than one year or to a fine of not less than S$10,000 and having not received a free pardon, except that where the conviction is by a foreign court, the offence is also one which, had it been committed in Singapore, would have been punishable by a court in Singapore;
(f) having voluntarily acquired the citizenship of, or exercised rights of citizenship in, a foreign country, or having made a declaration of allegiance to a foreign country;
(g) being disqualified under any law relating to offences in connection with elections to Parliament or the office of President by reason of having been convicted of such an offence or having in proceedings relating to such an election been proved guilty of an act constituting such an offence.

- Must be a person of integrity, good character and reputation.
- Must not be a member of any political party on the date of his or her nomination for election.
- Must satisfy either the public sector or private sector service requirement introduced on 1 April 2017:
  - Public sector requirement. The person must have held office:
  - (a) as Minister, Chief Justice, Speaker, Attorney-General, Chairman of the Public Service Commission, Auditor-General, Accountant-General or Permanent Secretary;
  - (b) as the chief executive of a key statutory board or government company: the Central Provident Fund Board, the Housing and Development Board, the Jurong Town Corporation, the Monetary Authority of Singapore, GIC, or Temasek Holdings;
  - (c) in some other public sector office, and the Presidential Elections Committee ("PEC") "is satisfied, having regard to the nature of the office and the person's performance in the office, that the person has experience and ability that is comparable to the experience and ability of a person who satisfies paragraph (a) or (b)", and "that the person has the experience and ability to effectively carry out the functions and duties of the office of President".
- Paragraphs (a) and (b) above have been described as the "automatic track", and paragraph (c) as the "deliberative track". The person must have served in the above capacity for a single period of three or more years or for two periods adding up to three or more years, and the period(s) of service must fall partly or wholly within the 20-year period before the date when a writ of election is issued to initiate the presidential election process.
  - Private sector requirement. The person must have served in one of the following capacities:
  - (a) As the chief executive of a company with an average of $500 million in shareholders' equity for the most recent three years in that office, and which is profitable after taxes. If the person is no longer the company's chief executive when the writ of election is issued, the company must not have been subject to any insolvency event for three years from the last day of the person's service, or the date of the writ of election, whichever is earlier, assessed on the basis of events happening on or before the writ of election.
  - (b) In an office in a private sector organisation, and the PEC is "satisfied, having regard to the nature of the office, the size and complexity of the private sector organisation and the person's performance in the office, that the person has the experience and ability that is comparable to the experience and ability of a person who has served as the chief executive of a typical company with at least [a shareholders' equity of $500 million] and who satisfies paragraph (a) in relation to such service", and "that the person has the experience and ability to effectively carry out the functions and duties of the office of President".
- Again, paragraph (a) is the automatic track, and paragraph (b) the deliberative track. The person must have served in the above capacity for a single period of three or more years or for two periods adding up to three or more years, and the period(s) of service must fall partly or wholly within the 20-year period before the date when a writ of election is issued to initiate the presidential election process.

The public and private sector requirements were adopted by Parliament on the recommendation of a Constitutional Commission chaired by Chief Justice Sundaresh Menon, which had been convened by Prime Minister Lee Hsien Loong to recommend improvements to the Elected President scheme. In its report issued on 17 August 2016, the Commission said it was desirable to make the requirements more stringent to ensure the president "has the technical competence and expertise to discharge the functions and exercise the powers of the Presidency appropriately and effectively". Furthermore, stricter qualifications would "temper any politicisation of the Presidential office and of the election process": they would "likely reduce the prospect that candidates will target their campaigns at their opponent's character and qualifications, since each candidate who qualifies would have satisfied the PEC that they possess those traits".

There is no restriction on the number of times a qualified person can be elected president.

=== Strictness of qualifications ===
During its inception, the elected president's qualification criteria required a private sector candidate to have had the experience running large, complex companies with a paid-up capital of S$100 million as a chairperson or chief executive. For public sector candidates, the key public service appointment holders who qualify include ministers, the Chief Justice, Speaker of Parliament, the Attorney-General, and permanent secretaries. Since 1993, the strict qualification criteria had resulted in walkovers during the elections of 1999, 2005 and 2017. The full details of the aspirants, candidacies and outcomes of the presidential elections (PE) are given in the summary table.

In the 1993 PE, Ong Teng Cheong gained the presidency after contesting the election against one nominated candidate, Chua Kim Yeow. Two aspirants, including J. B. Jeyaratnam were rejected on the basis that they did not meet the qualifying criteria. In the 1999 PE, the incumbent Ong had refrained from running for a second term and S. R. Nathan gained the presidency by walkover. Two aspirants were rejected on the basis that they did not meet the qualifying criteria. All three individuals, Ong, Chua and Nathan had qualified for the PE on the public sector track based on their former appointments as minister, accountant-general and permanent secretary respectively.

In the 2005 PE, Nathan went for a second term and gained the presidency by walkover again. Two aspirants were rejected on the basis that they did not meet the qualifying criteria. One of them, Andrew Kuan had held the position of chief financial officer (CFO) of a statutory board but was deemed not comparable to the acceptable positions listed under the constitution.

In the 2011 PE, Tony Tan gained the presidency after contesting the election against three nominated candidates (Tan Cheng Bock, Tan Jee Say and Tan Kin Lian). Two aspirants, including Andrew Kuan, were rejected on the basis that they did not meet the qualifying criteria. Tony Tan had qualified for the PE on the public sector track based on his former appointment as Minister while Tan Cheng Bock, Tan Jee Say and Tan Kin Lian had qualified on the private sector track. In the closely fought contest, Tony Tan had won the election by a narrow margin of 0.35% over Tan Cheng Bock.

In 2016, the eligibility requirements for private sector candidates were raised from "S$100 million paid up capital" for a company ran to "S$500 million shareholder equity" (SE) and the company had to be net profitable. In addition, the appointment required to be held by the candidate was changed from "Chairman/CEO" to the "most senior executive of the company" to preclude any non-executive appointments. Since 2017, the Presidential Elections Committee (PEC) is known to have rejected various candidates on the basis that they lacked the experience related to managing a "very large" private sector organisation with more than S$500 million (US$272 million) SE and showing profitability after tax over three years. The eligibility requirements for public sector candidates do not have similar performance criteria. It was known that the constitutional changes to the eligibility requirements would deny the two losing candidates from the last PE, Tan Cheng Bock and Tan Jee Say, a chance to re-contest future presidential elections.

The 2017 PE was reserved for the Malay community on the grounds that they had not held the presidency since 1970. In the same year, Tan Cheng Bock filed a constitutional challenge that concerned the setting of the 2017 PE as a reserved election. The contention was that the five consecutive terms required to trigger a reserved election should not have started from the final term of Wee Kim Wee as he was not an elected president. The challenge was dismissed by the High Court.

In the 2017 PE, Halimah Yacob gained the presidency by walkover after three aspirants were rejected. Yacob had qualified for the PE on the public sector track based on her former appointment as Speaker of Parliament. Two of the aspirants, Mohamed Salleh Marican and Farid Khan were rejected on the basis that their managed companies did not measure up to the SE criteria. Marican had run the company (Second Chance) with an average S$258 million SE while Khan had run the company (Bourbon Offshore Asia Pacific) with more than S$350 million but short of the S$500 million expected SE. The aspirants felt that the qualifying criteria were too restrictive and Singaporeans will be disappointed at being denied a chance to vote.

In the 2023 PE, the incumbent Yacob had refrained from running for a second term. Tharman Shanmugaratnam gained the presidency after contesting the election against two nominated candidates (Ng Kok Song and Tan Kin Lian). Tharman and Ng had qualified for the PE on the public sector track, based on their former appointments, respectively, as minister, and deliberatively as CEO of a fifth Schedule Entity. On the other hand, Tan had qualified for the PE based on the private sector track. Three other aspirants were rejected on the basis that they did not meet the qualifying criteria. One of them, George Goh Ching Wah was rejected because he had combined five smaller companies (Ossia, Pertama, ITG International, Crown Essentials, Vernal Ventures) in lieu of a unitary "very large" organisation for consideration of having met the SE and profitability criteria. In rejecting his bid, Goh felt that the decision was unfair and the PEC had adopted a "very narrow interpretation". Ng and Tan had both expressed that they had stepped up as candidates to offer an alternative choice to the electorate as they were concerned that Goh, would be disqualified by the PEC due to the stringent requirements.

The strict requirements have been justified on the basis that the president should be a person of integrity and moral standing, with the ability to monitor the financial affairs of the state and the management of the public service sector. Prime Minister Lee Hsien Loong has argued that this stringent screening process is necessary as the president does not stand as a political party nominee. They are thus not subjected to the internal screening mechanism of the ruling People's Action Party (PAP).

The qualifying criteria have been criticised as elitist and pro-establishment in nature. The argument against allowing the electorate to elect as president a candidate of their choice without the need for candidates to meet detailed qualification criteria has been said to be "unconvincing" and predicated on "the government's paternalistic distrust of the electorate".

It has been pointed out that the stringent criteria severely limit the pool of available candidates. In 2005, the prime minister's press secretary estimated that only 700 to 800 people potentially satisfied the criteria concerning the S$100 million paid-up capital for private sector candidates. In 2016, the criteria were further raised by mandating that firms have a minimum S$500 million shareholder equity, prospective candidates have served for at least three years as the chief executive, while the firms are continuously profitable. This is not withstanding that apart from the government linked companies, global MNCs are likely to bring in expatriate talents as the chief executive to oversee the subsidiary units headquartered in Singapore. In 2023, the deputy prime minister Lawrence Wong revealed that there are only 413 companies with more than S$500 million shareholder equity. Only two in five, or 165 of these companies have chief executives or managing directors who are Singapore citizens. The aforementioned may be contrary to the principle of equality under the law as it "impairs the equal right of candidature". It also runs contrary to the principle of democracy which "demands that a broad selection of people should be able to stand for high public office". However, the press secretary wrote that the dignity of the office of the president and Singapore's reputation would be diminished by elections in which "manifestly unfit candidates participate, just for the sake of having one".

=== Political endorsement ===
Singapore law does not prevent political parties, the Government, or non-governmental bodies with close government ties from endorsing candidates. The first presidential election in Singapore in 1993 pitted Ong Teng Cheong, a former PAP Member of Parliament who had been Deputy Prime Minister and Chairman of the National Trades Union Congress (NTUC), against the former Accountant-General, Chua Kim Yeow. Chua showed initial reluctance, accepting the nomination only as his "national duty" and even proclaiming Ong to be the far superior candidate. He declined to campaign, saying he could not afford it. However, he did address the populace via two ten-minute broadcasts offered by state-owned television and radio stations. His appeal was based on preventing an over-concentration of powers – he asked Singaporeans whether they wanted the PAP to dominate the Presidency as well. In contrast, Ong invested $50,000 to $60,000 of his own money in the campaign. He was assisted by the NTUC which mobilized its 230,000 members to canvass at least five votes each for their former union boss. Ong was backed by Prime Minister Goh Chok Tong who appealed to Singaporeans to vote for him. On polling day, 28 August 1993, Ong received 952,513 votes (58.7%) and Chua 670,358 votes (41.3%) out of a total of 1,756,517 votes. Ong was thus declared the first Elected President of Singapore. Ironically, Ong himself said that his links to the PAP might have cost him a few percentage points in votes. Given the strong show of government support for Ong, commentators expressed the view that Ong's victory meant a victory for the PAP and the continuation of its values and style of governance. Although the votes for Ong fell short of the PAP's expected 60–70% range, the result was not seen as a repudiation of the PAP but as indicative of Singaporeans' appetite for stronger checks and balances.

At both the 1999 and 2005 presidential elections, S. R. Nathan was elected by default as the only eligible candidate on nomination day. While being a member of a minority community worked to his advantage, he was unanimously endorsed by the 1999 Cabinet because of the merit of his overall qualities. Similarly, Nathan's decision to run for a second term in 2005 was accompanied by declarations of support from Government ministers and organizations like the NTUC.

Halimah Yacob, who was declared elected as president on 13 September 2017 as she was the only person the PEC found qualified to be a candidate in the 2017 election, is a former Speaker of Parliament and a former member of the PAP's Central Executive Committee. She was endorsed by the prime minister and the NTUC.

The practice of the PAP endorsing a candidate has led to criticisms that this is improper as the Government is essentially "revealing who they would rather have as their supervisor". Ong, who received the PAP's endorsement during the 1991 elections, revealed in a later interview:

[T]here was a swing of support over to my opponent's side, especially in the educated class ... The issue was whether they wanted a PAP man as president to check on a PAP government, or whether it would be better to have a neutral independent like Chua. That's why they voted against me because I had the PAP government support. I would have been happier without the PAP's open support.

Furthermore, such endorsements can be said to undermine the principle that a candidate for president should not be beholden to any political formation, which is reflected in the requirement for a candidate not to be a member of any political party.

The Menon Constitutional Commission declined to recommend that political endorsements be prohibited, expressing the view that "[p]olitical parties are likely to have strong and potentially relevant views on the merits or demerits of Presidential candidates. The presence of an endorsement by a political party might be a factor that voters might wish to consider in the exercise of their vote. The Commission also considers that it would not be feasible, in any case, to prevent endorsements by politicians speaking in their public, as opposed to personal, capacities, as it would be very difficult to distinguish between the two in practice."

=== Reserved elections ===
Constitutional amendments that came into effect on 1 April 2017 provide for a presidential election to be reserved for a community in Singapore if no one from that community has been president for any of the five most recent terms of office of the president. Candidates are required to satisfy the usual qualification criteria, and the communities are the Chinese community, the Malay community, and the Indian or other minority communities, and persons belonging to these communities are defined as follows:

- Chinese community – "any person who considers himself/herself to be a member of the Chinese community and who is generally accepted as a member of the Chinese community by that community".
- Malay community – "any person, whether of the Malay race or otherwise, who considers himself/herself to be a member of the Malay community and who is generally accepted as a member of the Malay community by that community".
- Indian or other minority communities – "any person of Indian origin who considers himself/herself to be a member of the Indian community and who is generally accepted as a member of the Indian community by that community, or any person who belongs to any minority community other than the Malay or Indian community".

A writ of election may declare that a presidential election is reserved for one, two or three communities. If an election is reserved for either two or three communities, then in the first place the election is reserved for the community that has not had a representative as president for the greater number of consecutive terms of office before the election. If the election "wholly fails" in the sense that no person from the community stands or will stand nominated as a candidate on nomination day, a fresh writ of election must be issued for an election reserved for the community that has not had a representative as president for the next greatest number of consecutive terms of office, and so on. If all the reserved elections wholly fail, an open election (one in which the candidates need not be from any particular community) will be held.

The Menon Constitution Commission recommended that a reserved election procedure be introduced as "[i]t enables the representation of all racial groups in the Presidency in a meaningful way while being minimally prescriptive. […] Further, it is also race-neutral as it does not single out any one ethnic group for protection. Most importantly, it has a 'natural sunset' – if free and unregulated elections produce Presidents from a varied distribution of ethnicities, the requirement of a reserved election will never be triggered."

For the purpose of determining if an election is reserved or not, Parliament amended the Presidential Elections Act to declare the presidential terms that would be counted, as follows:

Term no.	President	Community
1	Wee Kim Wee	Chinese
2	Ong Teng Cheong	Chinese
3	S. R. Nathan	Indian
4	S. R. Nathan	Indian
5	Tony Tan	Chinese
6	Halimah Yacob	Malay
7	Tharman Shanmugaratnam	Indian

As the result was to cause the 2017 election to be reserved for the Malay community, Tan Cheng Bock, a Chinese Singaporean who received the second highest number of votes in the 2011 presidential election, was not entitled to participate in it. This led to suggestions that the reserved election scheme was an elaborate plan to block his candidacy, with some social media users mockingly referring to the move as "Tan Cheng Block".

At a dialogue on the changes to the Elected President scheme on 15 September 2016, Law Minister K. Shanmugam addressed the allegation, saying: "[A]sk yourself logically, […] do we, as a Government, do what is right, based on the system, or do we worry [that] some people are going to say this is to knock out people we don't like? You know, more than 1,000 people will qualify from the private sector. Do you think we know who they are and we can make sure that they are all going to be OK? It’s not possible." He also expressed the view that Tan would not satisfy the new qualification criteria as he had held a non-executive post in a company, and the company did not have shareholders' equity of at least $500 million. In a Facebook post two days later, Tan asked: "Is there some truth after all that the changes in the rules was [sic] to make sure I would not be eligible? It would be a sad day for Singaporeans if a constitutional change was made because of an individual." The Singapore Government denied the accusation, Shanmugam stating at another forum held on 18 September that the amendments to the Elected President scheme were aimed at "improving the system for Singapore's long-term future, not at barring certain individuals from standing".

Tan subsequently challenged the constitutionality of including President Wee Kim Wee in the list before the courts. He argued that the Constitution should be interpreted as requiring only Presidents who had been elected in a popular election to be counted, whereas Wee had only exercised the powers of an Elected President without having gone through such an election. Both the High Court and Court of Appeal disagreed, the latter holding that Parliament had, by enacting Article 164 of the Constitution, legitimately given itself the power to specify the first presidential term to be counted for determining whether an election is reserved.

On 28 August 2017, Prime Minister Lee issued a writ of election for the 2017 presidential election, which was the first reserved election since the scheme's introduction. Only candidates from the Malay community were eligible to take part in it.

== Election procedure ==
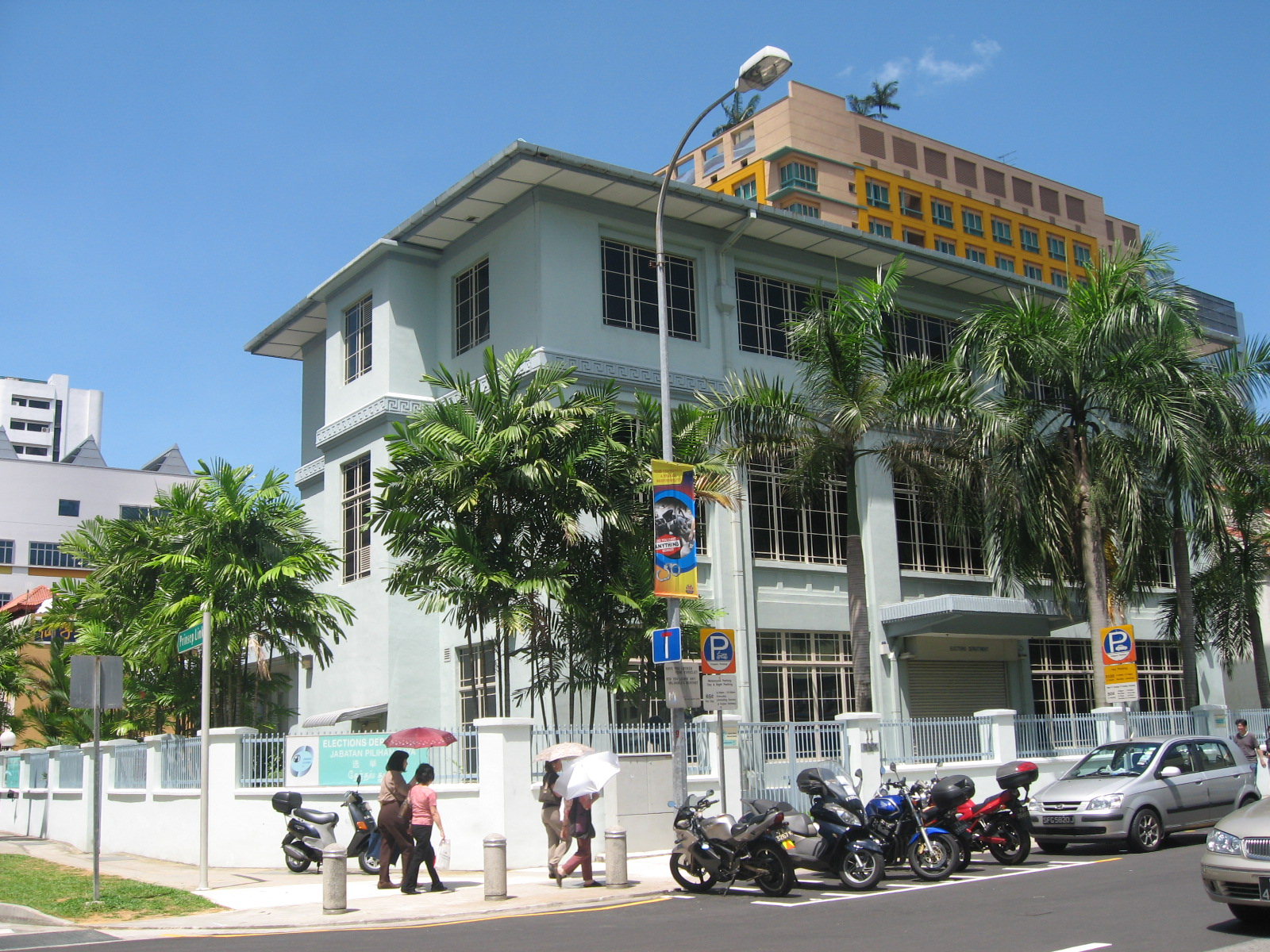
The Elections Department, which oversees elections in Singapore

The president holds office for a term of six years from the date on which he assumes office. The office of president becomes vacant when the term of the incumbent expires, or before this event if, among other things, the president dies, resigns, or is removed from office for misconduct or mental or physical infirmity. If the office of president falls vacant before the incumbent's term expires, a poll for an election is to be held within six months. In other cases, the election must take place not more than three months before the date of expiration of the incumbent's term of office. Article 17A(1) of the Constitution provides that "[t]he President is to be elected by the citizens of Singapore in accordance with any law made by the Legislature". The Presidential Elections Act lays out the election procedure in Singapore.

=== Issuance of writ of election ===
To initiate the election process, the prime minister issues a writ addressed to the returning officer, who is responsible for overseeing the election. The writ of election states when nomination day will be (which must not be less than ten days nor more than a month after the date of the writ), and the place of nomination. The returning officer is required to notify the public that the writ of election has been issued and the day, time and place of nomination of candidates by publishing a notice in the Government Gazette at least four clear days before nomination day.

=== Application for certificate of eligibility ===
A potential candidate for president must apply to the Presidential Elections Committee for a certificate of eligibility ("COE"). This can be done any time after the office of the president falls vacant before the end of the incumbent's term, or within three months before the expiry of the incumbent's term. The deadline for applications is five days after the date when the writ of election is issued.

The PEC is tasked to ensure that a candidate fulfils the necessary qualifications set out in the Constitution. The committee consists of the chairman of the Public Service Commission (PSC), the chairman of the Accounting and Corporate Regulatory Authority, a member of the Presidential Council for Minority Rights, a member or former member of the Council of Presidential Advisers, a person who is qualified to be or has been a Supreme Court judge, and a person appointed by the prime minister "who in the opinion of the Prime Minister has expertise and experience acquired in the private sector that is relevant to the functions of the Committee". The chairman of the PSC chairs the committee. The PEC must be satisfied that the candidate "is a person of integrity, good character and reputation", and has met either the public or private sector service requirement. In particular, a candidate wishing to qualify through the deliberative route must satisfy the PEA of the necessary experience and ability to effectively carry out the president's functions and duties. If the candidate satisfies the PEC, the Committee must issue a COE no later than the day before nomination day.

The PEC's decision as to whether a candidate fulfils the two requirements mentioned above is final and not subject to appeal or judicial review in any court. The PEC is not constitutionally required to provide any justification for its decision. In the absence of malice, the Committee is immune from a defamation suit when it discharges its functions under the Presidential Elections Act.

The non-justiciable nature of the PEC's decisions has been criticised as contrary to the rule of law as the PEC is not accountable to any external body and its operations are "less than transparent". If the PEC thinks fit, it may ask an applicant for a COE or his or her referees to provide further information, interview the applicant or any referee, or inform itself on any matter or consult any person. However, a candidate has no right to insist that the Committee take any of these steps.

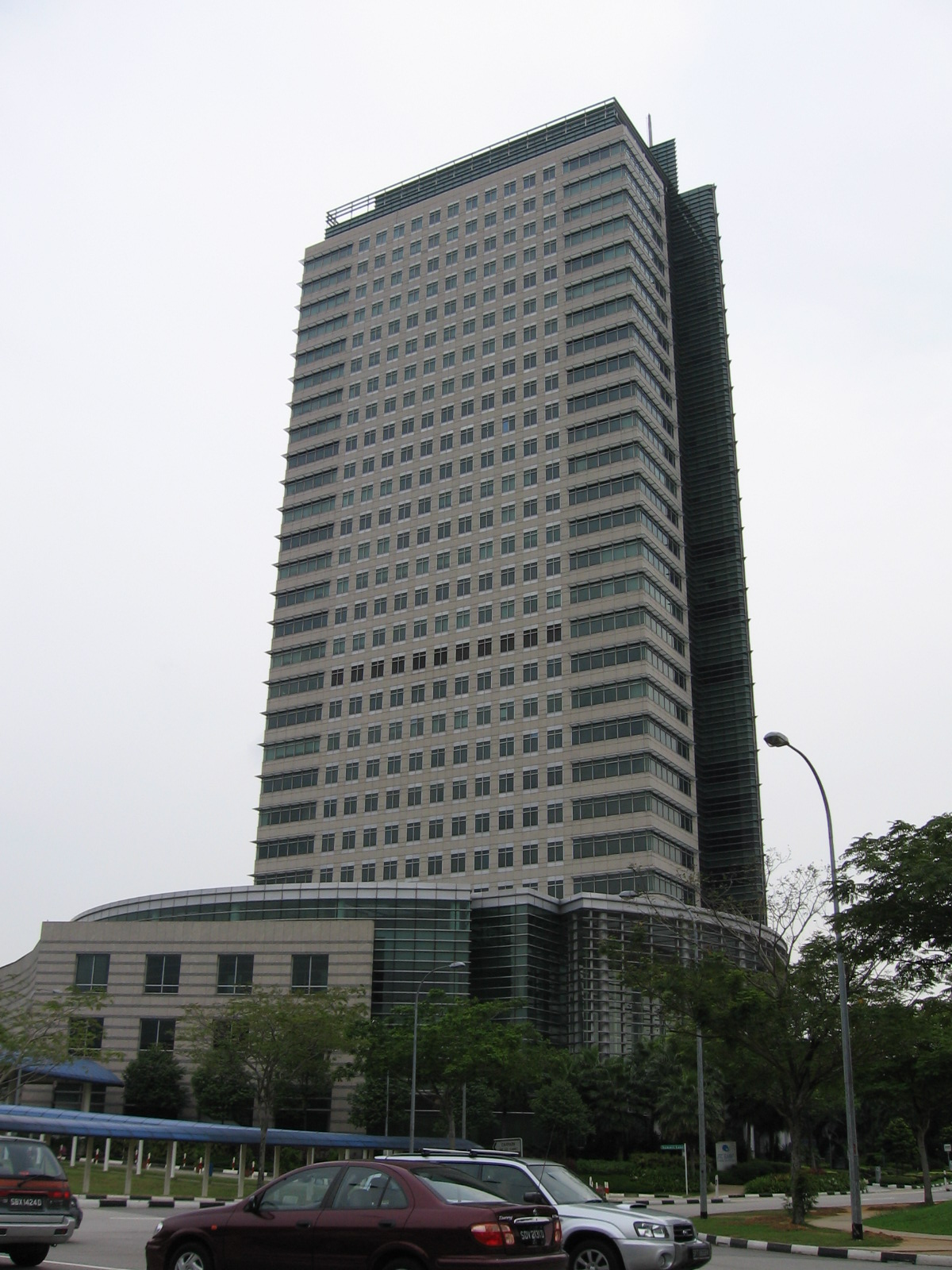
The JTC Summit, the present headquarters of JTC Corporation (formerly the Jurong Town Corporation). Andrew Kuan, an unsuccessful potential candidate in the 2005 presidential election, was a former CFO of the JTC.

One of the potential candidates during the 2005 presidential election was Andrew Kuan, then running his own executive search firm, Blue Arrow International. He had been a grassroots leader in Pasir Ris and a PAP member, as well as chief financial officer (CFO) of the Jurong Town Corporation (JTC) and the Hyflux joint venture. Kuan was thrust into the media limelight after announcing his bid. While Kuan was financially sound, reports reflecting a range of reactions towards his bid surfaced. Whereas some saw him as "conceited" and "arrogant", there were others who spoke of him warmly. This was followed by reports of him having been ousted from his position as chairman of his condominium's management committee in May 2001. Reports of Kuan's performance from his former employers also surfaced. JTC reported that Kuan had needed more "handholding" than was appropriate for a CFO and had been asked to resign thrice. Kwan asserted that his performance had been rated "good" for eight months and had received performance bonuses. Another former employer, Inderjit Singh, a PAP Member of Parliament and founder of United Test & Assembly Centre, said Kuan's performance as a consultant had been unsatisfactory. Kuan lodged a defamation suit against Singh, but eventually withdrew it.

The PEC eventually denied Kuan a COE on the grounds that he lacked the requisite financial credentials and responsibility required by the Constitution. Kuan was not given an opportunity to be interviewed by the PEC despite the negative media reports, which were speculated to have contributed to the PEC's decision not to issue him a COE. The prime minister's press secretary said that public hearings would "politicise the decision" and therefore affect the independence of the PEC. It has been argued that since the PEC's decision not to issue a COE may cast aspersions on an applicant's character, the lack of a procedure for the candidate to respond to negative findings in a public setting is contrary to the principles of natural justice. This is even more so given that the PEC is immune from defamatory actions.

In addition, it has been said that the independence of the PEC's decision-making process could be affected by political endorsements of a candidate expressed prior to the issuance of his COE.

During the 2017 election, potential candidates Farid Khan and Mohamed Salleh Marican were not issued COEs by the PEC. While Khan did not reveal the grounds on which his COE application was turned down, Salleh Marican disclosed the letter sent to him by the PEC which stated that the Committee had been unable to satisfy itself that he had experience and ability comparable to the chief executive of a typical company with at least $500 million in shareholders' equity. This was because Salleh Marican's company had only averaged shareholders' equity of about $258 million for its last three financial years, which was "considerably below" $500 million. Moreover, the principal activities of the company "were those of an investment holding company, retailing of garments, holding of property as investment for rental income, investing in equities, and trading in bonds and equities". As the only qualified candidate, Halimah Yacob was declared elected as president on nomination day, 13 September 2017, without the need for a poll.

=== Application for community certificate ===
With effect from 1 April 2017, each potential candidate must submit a community declaration to the Community Committee. The Committee comprises a chairman, five members of the Chinese community (forming the Chinese Community Sub-Committee), five members of the Malay community (the Malay Community Sub-Committee), and five members of the Indian or other minority communities (the Indian and Other Minority Communities Sub-Committee). In a community declaration, potential candidates are required to state that they consider themselves a member of the Chinese community, Malay community, or Indian or other minority communities, and wish to apply for a community certificate to this effect. Alternatively, they can state that they do not consider themselves to be a member of any of these communities. The period for submission of community declarations begins three months before the term of the incumbent president expires, and ends five days after the date of the writ of election.

The Community Committee may reject a community declaration on the ground that, among other things, the declarant did not apply for a COE. During a reserved election, a declaration must also be rejected if the declarant does not state that he or she considers himself or herself to be a member of the community to which the election is reserved. In the 2017 election which was reserved to the Malay community, the Community Committee rejected two declarations, one from a declarant who stated he belonged to the Chinese community, and one from a declarant who said he was not a member of either the Chinese community, Malay community, or Indian or other minority communities. During a non-reserved election, potential candidates who state that they do not consider themselves to be members of the Chinese community, Malay community, or Indian or other minority communities may be given an opportunity by the Community Committee or a Sub-Committee to submit another community declaration.

If the Community Committee accepts a community declaration, it must then refer the declaration to the appropriate Community Sub-Committee for consideration. If the Community Sub-Committee concludes that the declarant belongs to that community, it must issue a community certificate to the applicant. Otherwise, it must inform the declarant in writing that the application has been rejected. The decision must be communicated to the declarant no later than the eve of nomination day. All decisions of the Community Committee and its Sub-Committees are final, and a community certificate is conclusive of the matters it certifies – they are not subject to appeal or review in any court.

=== Political donations ===
Under the Political Donations Act, candidates for presidential elections may only receive political donations from Singapore citizens who are at least 21 years old, or Singapore-controlled companies which carry on business wholly or mainly in Singapore. The receipt of anonymous donations is prohibited, except for anonymous donations totalling less than $5,000 received during a period starting with the date 12 months before the date when the candidate makes the declaration referred to below and ending with nomination day.

After the date of the writ of election and at least two clear days before nomination day, a candidate or prospective candidate must provide the Registrar of Political Donations with a report stating all the donations received from permissible donors that amount to at least $10,000 received during the 12 months preceding the declaration mentioned in the next sentence. He must also submit to the Registrar a declaration stating, to the best of his knowledge and belief, that he did not receive any other donations required to be mentioned in the donation report, and that only donations from permissible donors or allowable anonymous donations were accepted. If this paperwork is in order, the Registrar will issue a political donation certificate not later than the eve of nomination day stating that the candidate has complied with the provisions of the Act.

=== Nomination ===
A person who satisfies the eligibility requirements set out in the Constitution is entitled to be nominated as a presidential candidate. Between 11:00 a.m. and 12:00 noon on nomination day, the candidate must submit a nomination paper to the Elections Department. The nomination paper requires the personal particulars of the nominee, candidacy endorsements (proposer, seconder and four to eight assenters) as well as statutory declaration that the person is qualified to be elected, not a member of a political party, and that the person understands the president's constitutional role in the following terms:

(i) the President is the Head of State and the symbol of national unity;
(ii) it is also the function of the President to safeguard the reserves of Singapore and the integrity of the Public Services of Singapore, in accordance with the specific discretionary powers conferred on the President by the Constitution; and

(iii) the President must exercise his functions according to the advice of the Cabinet, except where the Constitution otherwise provides.

The nomination paper must be submitted to the Elections Department with the following requirements met:

- Political Donation Certificate
- Certificate of Eligibility
- Community Certificate
  - The declaration is to allow applicants to declare if they are from the Chinese, Malay, Indian or "other minorities" criteria.
  - If the election is reserved, the community certificate shall collaborate that the applicant belongs to the community for which the election is reserved.
  - If the election is non-reserved, either the issued certificate or a written rejection of the application by the Community Committee. If the person submitted a community declaration that did not include an application for a community certificate, he or she must submit the Community Committee's written acceptance of the declaration and a statutory declaration that he or she does not consider himself or herself a member of the Chinese community, Malay community, or Indian or other minority communities.
- Election Deposit
  - Between the date of the writ of election and 12:00 noon on nomination day, the applicant must submit a deposit amounting to three times of 8% of the total allowances payable to an elected Member of Parliament in the preceding calendar year, rounded to the nearest $500. The deposit for the 2023 presidential election is S$40,500.
  - The deposit is returned if the person is not nominated as a candidate, withdraws his or her candidature, or is eventually elected.
  - If a candidate contested the election, the deposit is only repaid if he or she polled more than one-eighth (12.5%/45°) of the total number of votes polled, not including rejected votes.

If on nomination day only one candidate stands nominated, he or she shall be declared elected to the office of president. This occurred at both the 1999 and 2005 elections, at which S. R. Nathan was deemed elected because he was the only candidate considered eligible by the PEC. The desirability of this state of affairs has been questioned on the basis that "[i]f an elected President is to have a mandate to protect the reserves and to veto proposed public appointments, it is desirable that he should receive a minimum percentage of votes cast by the electorate, as an endorsement of him". Allowing election by default arguably places the PEC's decision as to the eligibility of the candidates above the electorate's choice. One commentator has said that a true contest is needed to legitimise the institution of the Elected President. On the other hand, it has been argued that if there is no contest for the Presidency it does not affect the president's right or legitimacy to hold this office:

[A]s long as Singaporeans believe that the Constitution is the principal source of political legitimacy, a candidate who occupies the office by virtue of a walkover, as is consistent with the Constitution, has as much moral authority as one who wins in a contested election.

If, on nomination day, there are two or more candidates nominated for election, the returning officer must immediately adjourn the election so that a poll can be taken. He or she must assign each candidate an approved symbol to be printed on the candidate's ballot paper and announce by publishing a notice of contested election in the Government Gazette with information about the forthcoming poll, including the candidates' names and symbols, the date of polling day (which must be not earlier than the 10th day or later than the 56th day after the date of the notice) and the locations of polling stations.

=== Campaigning ===
During the election period, a candidate is not permitted to spend more than $600,000 or 30 cents for each person on the electoral register, whichever is the greater amount. For the 2017 election, based on the number of electors as at 28 August 2017, the election expenses limit was $754,982.40. It amounts to an illegal practice to pay to transport voters to or from the poll; or to pay a voter for the use of premises to display a notice, unless the voter is an advertising agent or the transaction is carried out in the ordinary course of business. It is also an illegal practice for a person to borrow or lend, hire or rent out, or use any motor vehicle to convey voters other than himself and his family members to or from the poll. Committing an illegal practice is a criminal offence, the penalty for which is a fine of up to $2,000 and disqualification for three years from being a voter or a candidate for Parliament or the office of president.

The following acts are also prohibited:

- Bribery. Doing any one of a number of acts to induce a person to vote or refrain from voting or to reward him for having done so, such as giving or lending money; and giving or procuring an office or employment, amounts to bribery. It is also bribery for a person to procure or promise to procure that a voter exercise his vote in a certain way or that a candidate be elected as president in return for some inducement; to give money to someone else, knowing that he will use the money for bribery at an election; to accept an inducement for voting or not voting or agreeing to do so; and to induce a person to consent to being nominated as a candidate, or refrain or withdraw from being a candidate in return for some inducement. The penalty is a fine of up to $5,000 or imprisonment not exceeding three years or both; and disqualification from being registered as a voter, voting at any election, or being elected to Parliament or the office of president for seven years.
- Dissuasion from voting. Dissuading or attempting to dissuade a person from voting verbally or in writing between nomination day and polling day is a criminal offence punishable with a fine of up to $2,000 or up to 12 months' jail or both.
- False statements. Offenders who make or publish false statements of fact regarding the personal character or conduct of a candidate, or false statements about a candidate's withdrawal from the election, are liable on conviction to a fine or jail of up to 12 months or both, and to the disqualifications referred to above.
- Treating. Treating is the act of corruptly giving or providing, or paying in whole or part for, any food, drink, refreshment, cigarette, entertainment or other thing, or any money or ticket or other means to enable such things to be obtained, in order to corruptly influence a person to vote or refrain from voting, or to induce the person to attend an election meeting, or to reward him for having done so. The penalty is a fine of up to $5,000 or imprisonment not exceeding three years or both, and the disqualifications referred to above.
- Undue influence. When a person makes use of or threatens to make use of force, violence or restraint, or inflicts or threatens to inflict temporal or spiritual injury, damage, harm or loss on a person to induce him to vote or refrain from voting, or to punish him for having done so; or uses abduction, duress or some fraudulent scheme to impede or prevent a person's free exercise of his vote, or to compel or induce him to vote or refrain from voting, this amounts to the offence of undue influence. The penalty is a fine of up to $5,000 or imprisonment not exceeding three years or both, and the disqualifications referred to above.

Candidates may use the Internet to publish election advertising, including posting content on electronic media applications (such as digital banners, instant messaging software, mobile applications, RSS feed readers and widgets), social networking services and other websites, and sending e-mails. SMS and MMS messages can also be sent. Candidates must notify the returning officer of each platform on the Internet that is used to publish election advertising within 12 hours after the start of the campaign period (that is, the time when the place of nomination closes on nomination day) and thereafter each time before a platform is used for such publication. Candidate and their election agents must use their best efforts to ensure that all Internet election advertising is published in accordance with the law; in other words, the returning officer must be satisfied that all reasonable steps in the circumstances were taken. Contravening any regulations relating to election advertising on the Internet is a criminal offence punishable by a fine of up to $1,000, jail of up to 12 months, or both.

In the 2017 election, candidates were to be allowed to make two ten-minute "presidential candidate broadcasts", one to be broadcast on television and radio the day after nomination day, and the other on the eve of cooling-off day. In addition, two discussion forums for candidates were to be organized and broadcast on television, one by Singapore Press Holdings on the third day after nomination day, and one by MediaCorp on the sixth day. Eventually, the broadcasts did not take place as Halimah Yacob won the election uncontested.

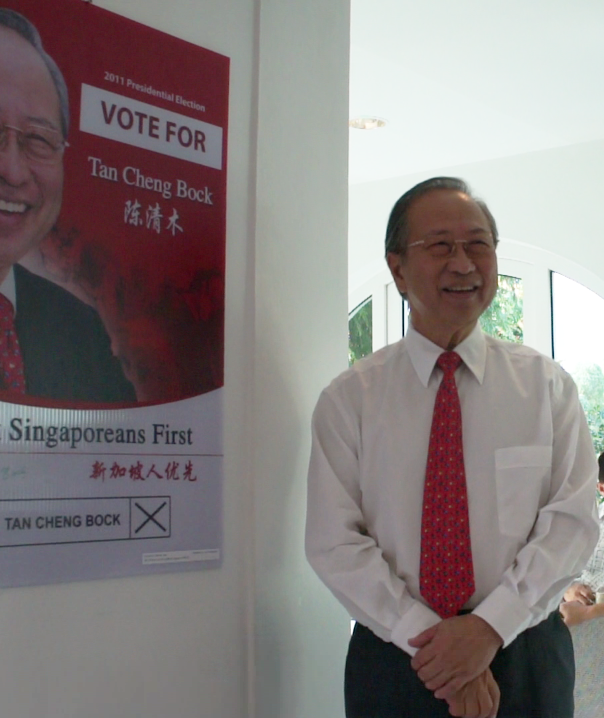
Tan Cheng Bock, a candidate in the 2011 presidential election, standing next to one of his campaign posters

A permit from the Commissioner of Police is required if a candidate wishes to hold an election meeting between nomination day and the day before the eve of polling day. The display of banners and posters by candidates during the campaigning period must also be authorized by the returning officer, who may impose conditions as to the places where or objects or things on which, and the manner in which, banners or posters may or may not be displayed. The returning officer also determines the maximum number of banners and posters that may be put up, bearing in mind the number of electors and the need to treat candidates equally. Further authorization is required if a candidate wishes to display election advertising in some other medium, such as a television broadcast; a display visible from any place to which the public or a section of the public has access; or a newspaper, magazine or periodical. Election banners and posters may not be displayed in such a way that they obscure the view of other banners and posters, or within 50 metres (160 ft) (or a shorter distance if so determined by the returning officer) of a polling station. Making inscriptions on buildings or roads is prohibited. It is an offence to display any banner or poster in breach of the law or the terms imposed by the returning officer; and to deface, destroy or remove any authorized banner or poster.

Between the day when the writ of election is issued and the close of the polls on polling day, it is an offence to publish or cause to be published the results of any election survey, defined as "an opinion survey of how electors will vote at an election or of the preferences of electors respecting any candidate or any issue with which an identifiable candidate is associated at an election". The penalty is a fine of up to $1,500, imprisonment of up to 12 months, or both.

=== Eve of polling day and polling day ===
In 2010, legal changes were introduced to turn the eve of polling day for both presidential and parliamentary elections into a "cooling-off day" on which no campaigning would be permitted. Prime Minister Lee justified the changes as enabling voters to think dispassionately about the candidates' stands on issues raised and reducing the chance of public disorder. On the eve and on polling day itself, election advertising is prohibited, though the following activities remain unaffected:

- distributing a book or promoting the sale of a book for not less than its commercial value if the book was planned to be published regardless of whether there was to be an election;
- publishing news relating to an election in a licensed newspaper in any medium or in a licensed radio or television broadcast;
- conveying one's own political views on a non-commercial basis to another individual by telephonic or electronic transmission;
- election advertising lawfully published or displayed on the Internet before the start of the eve of polling day which is not changed after its publication or display; and
- the continued lawful display of posters and banners already displayed before the start of the eve of polling day.

Until the polls have closed on polling day, it is prohibited to publish an exit poll, that is, "(a) any a statement relating to the way in which voters have voted at the election where that statement is (or might reasonably be taken to be) based on information given by voters after they have voted; or (b) any forecast as to the result of the election which is (or might reasonably be taken to be) based on information so given". If convicted, a person may be punished with a fine of up to $1,500, jail of up to 12 months, or both.

Badges, favours, flags, rosettes, symbols, sets of colours, advertisements, handbills, placards, posters and replica voting papers may not be carried, worn, used or displayed by any person or on any vehicle as political propaganda, although candidates may wear replicas of the symbols allotted to them for election purposes. In addition, holding election meetings and canvassing are not permitted on the day before polling day or on polling day itself. Canvassing involves trying to persuade a person to vote or not to vote in a particular way; or visiting a voter for an election-related purpose at home or at his or her workplace. It is an offence to exercise undue influence on any person at or near a polling station: for example, trying to find out the identity of any person entering a polling station; recording voters' particulars; and waiting outside or loitering within 200 metres (660 ft) of polling stations.

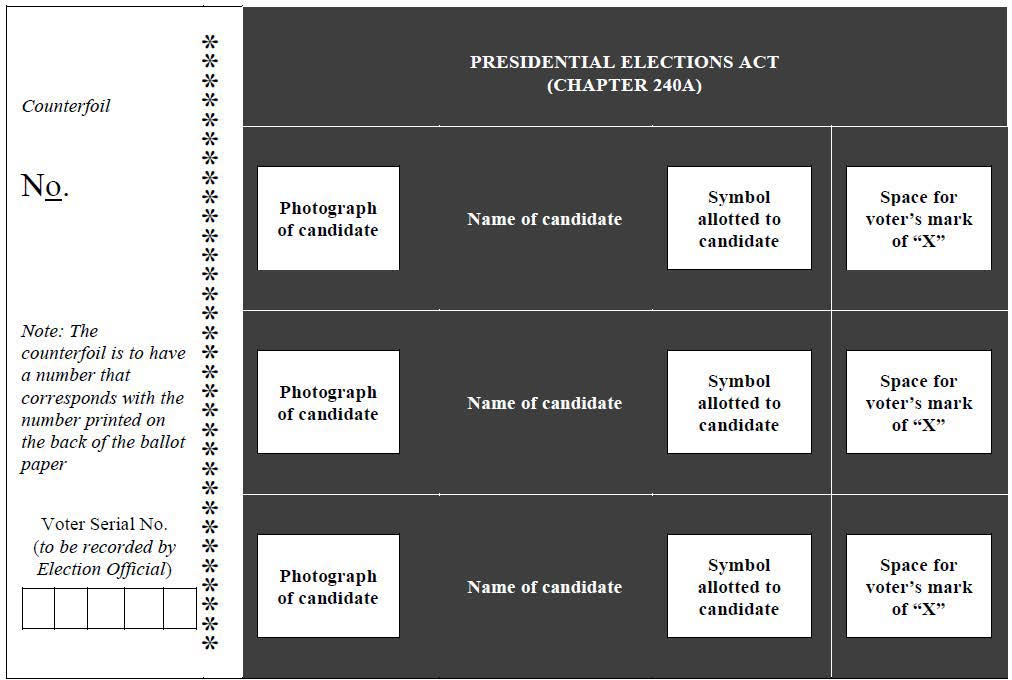
A form showing the layout of the front of a ballot paper used during presidential elections

Polling day is a public holiday and voting is compulsory. Unless the returning officer decides otherwise, polling stations are open from 8:00 a.m. to 8:00 p.m. on polling day. To vote, voters must go to the polling stations assigned to them. Applying for a ballot paper or voting in the name of someone else amounts to the offence of personation. If a person claiming to be a voter named in the electoral register turns up at a polling station after someone else claiming to be that voter has already voted, the second person is permitted to cast what is called a "tendered vote" using a ballot paper of a different colour after taking an oath to confirm his or her identity.

After the poll closes, the presiding officer of each polling station seals the ballot boxes without opening them. Candidates or their polling agents may affix their own seals to the ballot boxes. The ballot boxes are then taken to counting centres to be opened and the ballots counted. A candidate or his or her counting agent may ask the returning officer for a recount of votes if the difference between the number of votes for the candidate with the most votes and any other candidate's number of votes is 2% or less, excluding rejected and tendered votes. After all counts, and recounts if any, have been completed, the returning officer ascertains whether the total number of electors registered to vote overseas is less than the difference between the number of votes for the two candidates with the highest number of votes. If so, the returning officer declares the candidate with the highest number of votes to be elected as president. If not, the overseas votes may be decisive. The returning officer then states the number of votes cast for each candidate and the date and location where the overseas votes will be counted.

All officers, clerks, interpreters, candidates and candidates' agents at polling stations must maintain the secrecy of voting in stations. Before the poll is closed, they must not communicate to anyone the name of any elector who has not yet voted or his or her or identification number on the electoral register. They are prohibited from communicating information obtained during the counting of votes as to which candidate has been voted for in any particular ballot paper. Furthermore, no person is allowed to try to find out from within a polling station who a voter intends to vote for or has voted for, or to communicate with a voter after he has been given a ballot paper but before he has placed it in a ballot box.

=== Declaration that election is void ===
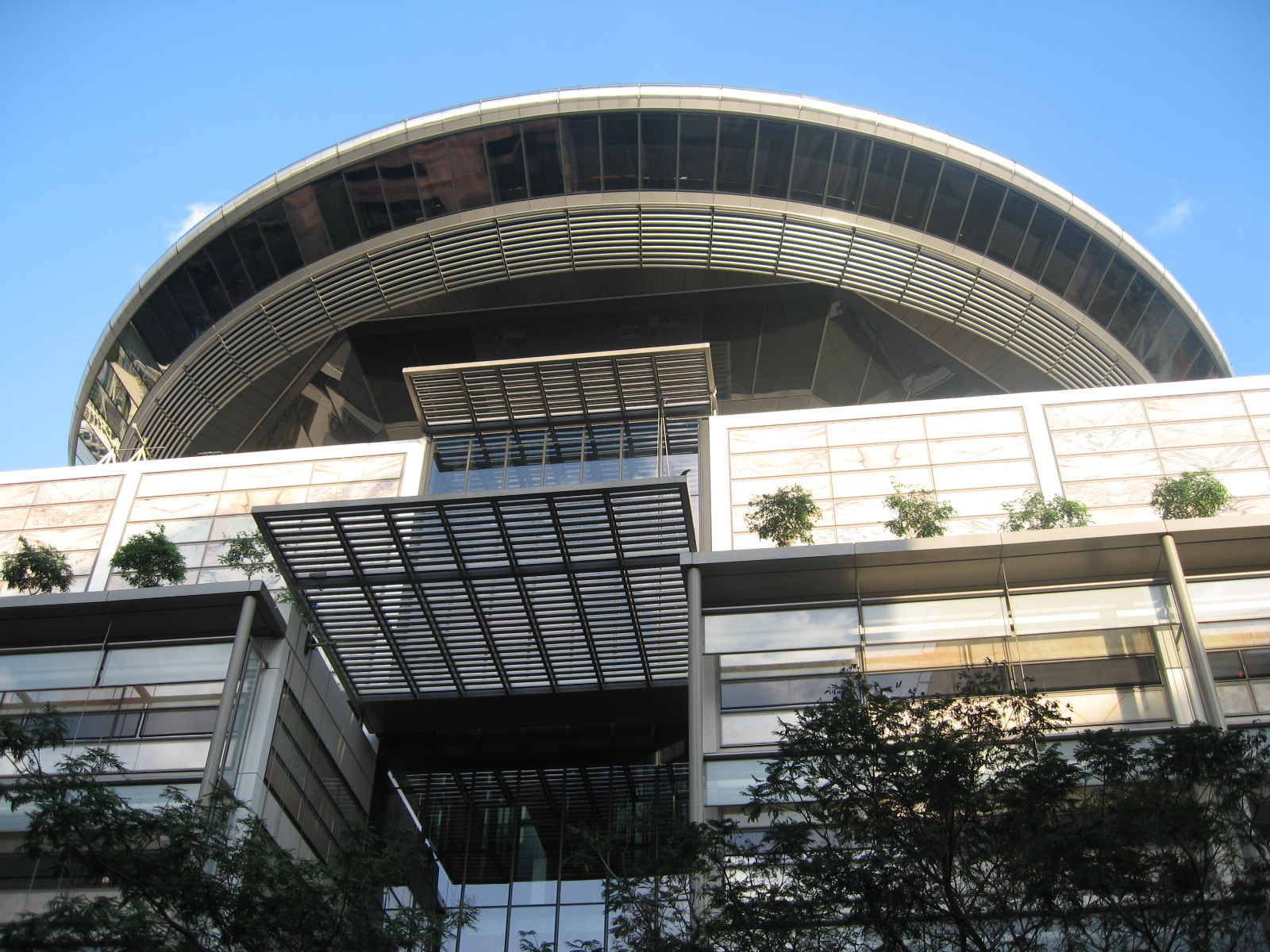
The Supreme Court of Singapore. The validity of a presidential election is determined by an election judge, who is the Chief Justice or a Supreme Court judge nominated by him.

A person claiming to have been a candidate at a presidential election or to have had a right to be elected, or a person who voted or had a right to vote at a presidential election, may apply to an election judge for a candidate's election as president to be declared void on any of the following grounds:

- The majority of voters was or might have been prevented from electing their preferred candidate due to a general occurrence of bribery, treating, intimidation or some other form of misconduct or circumstances.
- There was a failure to comply with the Presidential Elections Act and this affected the result of the election.
- A corrupt or illegal practice in connection with the election was committed by the candidate, or by an agent of the candidate with his knowledge or consent.
- The candidate personally hired someone as an election agent, canvasser or agent while aware that the person had been found guilty of a corrupt practice within the seven years before he was engaged.
- At the time the candidate was elected, he or she was disqualified from standing for election.

The Chief Justice or a Supreme Court judge nominated by him acts as the election judge.

The applicant for an election to be avoided may ask for a declaration that the election is void, that a particular candidate was wrongfully declared to have been elected, and/or that another candidate was duly elected. The applicant may also request for a scrutiny – that is, a re-examination of the ballot papers – if he or she alleges that an unsuccessful candidate had a majority of lawful votes. When a scrutiny is conducted, the election judge may order a vote to be struck off if the voter was not on the register of electors assigned to the polling station at which the vote was recorded or was not authorized to vote at the station; if the vote was obtained by bribery, treating or undue influence; if the voter committed or induced someone to commit the offence of personation; and if the vote was for a disqualified candidate and the disqualification was either a matter that the voter was aware of or was sufficiently publicized or widely known. During a scrutiny, a tendered vote that is shown to be valid will be added to the poll if any party to the proceedings asks for the vote to be added. On the other hand, a registered elector's vote will not be struck off at a scrutiny just because he or she was not qualified to be on the electoral register, and the returning officer's decision as to whether or not a ballot paper should be rejected may not be questioned.

The election judge is empowered to exempt from being an illegal practice any particular act or omission by a candidate, his or her election agents or any other agent or person in paying a sum, incurring an expense or entering into a contract if it was done in good faith and was due to inadvertence, accidental miscalculation or the like. Similarly, the judge may make an order allowing an authorized excuse for a failure to file a proper return or declaration relating to election expenses if the candidate or his or her principal election agent shows that he or she acted in good faith and that there is a reasonable explanation for the shortcoming such as inadvertence or illness, or the absence, death, illness or misconduct of some other agent, clerk or officer. In particular, the judge may relieve a candidate from the consequences of an act or omission by his or her principal election agent if he or she did not sanction or connive in it and took all reasonable means to prevent it.

The election judge certifies his or her decision, which is final, to the prime minister. The judge must also report to the prime minister whether any corrupt or illegal practice was established to have been committed by or with the knowledge and consent of any candidate or his or her agent. If a judge intends to report a person who was neither a party to the proceedings nor a candidate claiming he or she should have been declared elected, that person must be given an opportunity to be heard and to give and call evidence to show why a report should not be made against him. However, where a candidate's agents are found to have been guilty of treating, undue influence or an illegal practice, but the candidate proves that the offences were committed contrary to his or her orders and without his or her sanction or connivance, or that of his or her election agents, that all reasonable means were taken to prevent corrupt and illegal practices at the election, that the offences were of a trivial and limited nature, and in other respects the election was free from corrupt or illegal practice, the election is not void.

Depending on whether the judge has determined that the election was valid or void, the election return is confirmed or altered. If the election is declared void, the prime minister is empowered to order that another election be held within six months of the determination.

== Nomination results ==
Persons known publicly to have submitted an application for the Certificate of Eligibility to the Elections Department, and their public/private sector backgrounds (automatic or deliberative tracks) used to support their applications, are summarised in the table below.

Year	Public sector: key position or chief executive of public office	Pol apt	Pub svc	Private sector: chief executive of large company	Unclassified
1993	Chua Kim Yeow		✓	Nil	J. B. Jeyaretnam
1993	Ong Teng Cheong	✓		Nil	Tan Soo Phuan
1999	S. R. Nathan		✓	Nil	Ooi Boon Ewe
1999				Nil	Tan Soo Phuan
2005	Andrew Kuan Yoke Loon		✓	Nil	Ooi Boon Ewe
2005	S. R. Nathan		✓	Nil	Ramachandran Govindasamy Naidu
2011	Andrew Kuan Yoke Loon		✓	Tan Cheng Bock	Ooi Boon Ewe
2011	Tony Tan Keng Yam	✓		Tan Jee Say	
2011				Tan Kin Lian	
2017	Halimah Yacob	✓		Farid Khan	Shirwin Eu
2017				Mohamed Salleh Marican	Ooi Boon Ewe
2023	Ng Kok Song		✓	George Goh Ching Wah	unnamed
2023	Tharman Shanmugaratnam	✓		Tan Kin Lian	

Nomination data	1993	1999	2005	2011	2017	2023
a. Cert of Eligibility Applicants	4	3	4	6	5	6
b. Cert of Eligibility Accepted	2	1	1	4	1	3
c. Nomination Paper Applicants	2	1	1	4	1	3
d. Nomination Paper Accepted	2	1	1	4	1	3
e. Election Deposit Forfeited	0	–	–	1	–	0

Source: Election Results - ELD Singapore

== Election results ==
Year	Nomination date	Polling date	Nominated candidate(s)	Votes polled	% valid votes	Electoral votes	Notes
1993	18 August 1993	28 August 1993	Chua Kim Yeow	670,358	41.31%	41.31 / 100	
1993	18 August 1993	28 August 1993	Ong Teng Cheong	952,513	58.69%	58.69 / 100	
1999	18 August 1999	–	S. R. Nathan	Uncontested			
2005	17 August 2005	–	S. R. Nathan	Uncontested			
2011	17 August 2011	27 August 2011	Tan Cheng Bock	738,311	34.85%	34.85 / 100	
2011	17 August 2011	27 August 2011	Tan Jee Say	530,441	25.04%	25.04 / 100	
2011	17 August 2011	27 August 2011	Tan Kin Lian	104,095	4.91%	4.91 / 100	
2011	17 August 2011	27 August 2011	Tony Tan Keng Yam	745,693	35.20%	35.2 / 100	
2017	13 September 2017	–	Halimah Yacob	Uncontested			
2023	22 August 2023	1 September 2023					
2023	22 August 2023	1 September 2023	Ng Kok Song	390,636	15.72%	15.72 / 100	
2023	22 August 2023	1 September 2023	Tan Kin Lian	344,584	13.87%	13.87 / 100	
2023	22 August 2023	1 September 2023	Tharman Shanmugaratnam	1,749,261	70.41%	70.41 / 100	

Elector Data	1993	1999	2005	2011	2017	2023
a. Registered Voters	1,756,517	1,967,984	2,113,540	2,274,773	2,516,608	2,709,407
b. Total Votes Cast	1,659,482	–	–	2,156,389	–	2,534,711
c. Valid Votes #	1,622,871	–	–	2,118,540	–	2,484,481
d. Valid Votes c/b%	98%	–	–	98%	–	98%
e. Rejected Votes #	36,611	–	–	37,849	–	50,230
f. Rejected Votes e/b%	2.2%	–	–	1.8%	–	2.0%

Source: Election Results - ELD Singapore
