= 2017 Singaporean presidential election =

- 13 September 2017
- Registered: 2,516,608 (▲10.63%)
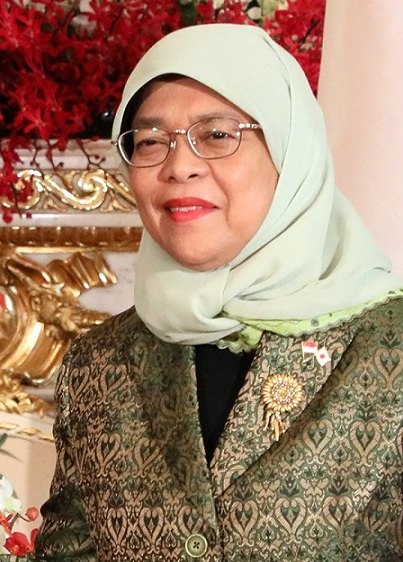
Nominee	Halimah Yacob
Party	Independent
Popular vote	Unopposed
President before election
J. Y. Pillay (acting)
Independent
Elected President
Halimah Yacob
Independent

Presidential elections were scheduled to be held in Singapore on 13 September 2017. Following amendments to the Constitution of Singapore, which resulted in the elections being reserved for candidates from the Malay community.

Halimah Yacob who had served as Speaker of Parliament from 2013 to 2017 was elected in an uncontested election after she was the only candidate granted an eligibility certificate. She was sworn in as the eighth President of Singapore on 14 September 2017.

== Background ==
The President is the head of state of Singapore. Following the Westminster system, the position is largely ceremonial, but enjoys several reserve powers including withholding presidential assent on supply bills and changing or revoking civil service appointments. The current system of holding elections for the Presidency began with the 1993 election, with the election of Ong Teng Cheong. Previously, the President was selected by Parliament.

There are strict requirements for prospective presidential election candidates, and whether a candidate meets the qualifications or not is decided by the Presidential Elections Committee (PEC), who are given the task of issuing a certificate of eligibility (COE) to prospective candidates. In short, candidates must satisfy either the public sector or private sector requirements. The public sector requirement has an automatic track where the candidate has held either a designated public office or chief executive position of a key statutory board or government company. The private sector requirement also has an automatic track where the candidate has held the chief executive position of a company with S$500 million shareholder equity and net profitability (revised in 2016 from S$100 million paid-up capital). Not withstanding the aforementioned, candidates could also be qualified on a deliberative track where their abilities and experiences have been assessed by the PEC to be equivalent to either of the public or private sector automatic track requirements.

The Presidency is, by the rules of the Constitution, required to be nonpartisan. However, Halimah had, until her presidential campaign, ties with the People's Action Party. She was a member of the party's Central Executive Committee, as well as the chair of the party's Seniors Group. She was also an elected PAP Member of Parliament and Speaker of Parliament prior to her resignation in 2017.

Following amendments to the Constitution of Singapore, the election was the first to be reserved for a particular racial group under a hiatus-triggered model. The 2017 election was reserved for candidates from the minority Malay community, who had not held the presidential office since 1970.

== Parliamentary reforms ==
In his speech to Parliament on 27 January 2016, Prime Minister Lee Hsien Loong said that it was timely to review the eligibility criteria of the Elected Presidency. On 10 February 2016, a Constitutional Commission consisting of nine individuals and chaired by Chief Justice Sundaresh Menon was formed. In its report released on 7 September 2016, the Commission recommended the following key changes:

1. The election should be reserved for a racial group if it is not represented for five terms, or 30 years. If there are no eligible candidates from that group, the election would be opened to candidates of all races, and the "reserved election" would be deferred to the next Presidential election.
2. The Council of Presidential Advisers (CPA) should be increased from six to eight members, with two alternate members. The President would have to consult the CPA on all monetary issues related to the financial reserves and all key public service appointments.
3. A qualifying candidate from the private sector should be a senior executive managing a company with at least S$500 million in shareholders' equity. Previously, such a candidate had to be a chairman or CEO of a company with at least S$100 million in paid-up capital.
4. For qualifying candidates from both the public and private sectors, the length of time that the candidate has held office should be doubled to six years.
5. The public sector offices of Accountant-General and Auditor-General should be removed from automatic qualification.
6. An applicant's entire qualifying tenure should fall within a 15-year period preceding Nomination Day.

The government announced in a White Paper published on 15 September 2016 that it has accepted some of the recommendations, including the first three changes above. The government raised the financial requirements for private sector candidates while keeping the requirements of public sector candidates constant, stating it is adopting a "cautious" approach given the other concurrent changes to other aspects of eligibility criteria. On 8 November 2016, PM Lee, under the advice from Attorney-General, announced that the 2017 Presidential Election will be reserved for candidates from the Malay community.

"We have taken the Attorney-General's advice. We will start counting from the first President who exercised the powers of the Elected President, in other words, Dr Wee Kim Wee. That means we are now in the fifth term of the Elected Presidency."

— Prime Minister Lee Hsien Loong,

The rules for campaigning have also been modified. Rally sites will no longer be designated for the candidates. All candidates are required to apply for police permit on their own to hold a rally. Also, candidates are required to sign a statutory declaration to affirm that they understand the roles of a president. These rules are purportedly made to ensure that the candidates campaign in a "dignified" manner.

=== Constitutional challenges ===
On 5 May 2017, Tan Cheng Bock, a former Member of Parliament (MP) from the People's Action Party (PAP) who contested in the Singaporean presidential election of 2011, filed a constitutional challenge to determine whether it is correct to set the Presidential Election 2017 as a reserved election under the newly introduced amendments to the Elected Presidency. His challenge was dismissed by Justice Quentin Loh in High Court, explaining that "Article 164(1)(a) provides for Parliament to specify the first term of office of the President to be counted under Art 19B(1) ("First Term")." He then filed an appeal, heard by the Court of Appeal on 31 July 2017. On 23 August 2017, his appeal was unanimously dismissed by the court of five judges which ruled that the Parliament has full discretion to set the First Term.

On 28 August 2017, the Workers' Party filed an adjournment motion on the election to debate on the issue in the next Parliament sitting on 11 September. On 5 September, the Workers' Party was informed that their motion was not selected for mention as Murali's topic on community sentencing won the ballot. The Workers' Party eventually raised their query in Parliament on 3 October through its chairperson Sylvia Lim, who challenged why the PAP government uses AGC's advice as a "red herring" to evade justifying its own decision of starting the count from President Wee Kim Wee instead of the first elected President Ong Teng Cheong. She quoted instances where PM Lee Hsien Loong, DPM Teo Chee Hean and Minister in Prime Minister's Office Chan Chun Sing spoke on the matter in parliament, when they stated that the AGC's advice was taken for deciding the starting count. In response, Law Minister Shanmugam said that the Government sought the AGC's advice on whether there would be "legal impediments" to start the count from President Wee, and that the timing of when to trigger the reserved election was a "policy decision" that was not based on the AGC's advice, as parliament has full discretion on this issue. He insisted that the Government has not misled the public by giving the impression that the decision was a legal one, and pointed to some unnamed individual, "not from the PAP", who was deemed by the court to be misleading the Parliament.

In a Facebook post, Tan Cheng Bock highlighted Shanmugam's apparent contradiction when he was quoted saying in Parliament, "once we get the (AGC's) advice, we will send it out". Shanmugam responded by accusing Tan of "splicing and rearranging" his words, insisting that "it" refers to the government's position instead of AGC's advice. He also called Tan "bitter".

On 22 May 2017, human rights lawyer M. Ravi filed a constitutional challenge, stating that the amendment to the Elected Presidency Scheme "deprives citizens of the right to stand" for the office of the Elected Presidency, is "discriminatory on the grounds of ethnicity", and that it contradicts article 12(2) of the Constitution. On 15 June 2017, his application was dismissed by the High Court with cost. Judge See Kee Oon said during the hearing that Ravi had not shown how his personal rights were violated by the changes that were made to the scheme. See added that Ravi therefore had "no standing" as a private citizen to mount the challenge. Ravi has since filed an appeal against the court's verdict. His appeal was scheduled to be heard on 31 July. Ravi's challenge was dismissed by Justic See Kee On, a high court judge on grounds that Ravi as a private citizen had "no standing" to mount a challenge.

On 13 September 2017, Wong Souk Yee filed a court appeal for, among other things, an order for a by-election to be held for Marsiling–Yew Tee (MYT) GRC that Yacob had vacated in order to contest the presidential election. The contention was that without a by-election, MYT GRC residents would not be fully represented in Parliament until the next general election which was due in 2021. The appeal was dismissed by the court.

=== Criticisms ===
The People's Action Party has been accused of using the Presidential office's imperative of preserving racial peace as a way to circumvent democracy and shore up its political power. The government has relied on a survey jointly conducted by online publication Channel NewsAsia, and National University of Singapore's Institute of Policy Studies (IPS), both with ties to the Singapore government, to support its case that Singaporeans are voting along racial lines. This is seen by some as a farcical attempt at combating voters' racial bias which, at every election, has been proven to have no impact on election results.

The reserved Presidential election is also seen as an elaborate plan to block the candidacy of Tan Cheng Bock, who lost by a thin margin of 0.35% in the 2011 Presidential elections to Tony Tan Keng Yam, a former deputy prime minister. Some social media users have mockingly referred to the move as "Tan Cheng Block". The Singapore government has denied the accusation.

A 16-member Community Committee was appointed by the prime minister, based on the nominations given by the Presidential Council for Minority Rights, to assess whether a candidate belongs to a particular racial group. Former MP Inderjit Singh questions why a different yardstick is used for determining the race of an individual instead of adopting the existing standards practised by ethnic self-help organisations SINDA and MENDAKI. In a forum held at IPS on 8 September 2017, law professor Kevin Tan pointed out that the Community Committee's ultimate power to decide a candidate's race, instead of using the court, is unconstitutional. Norshahril Saat, a fellow at the ISEAS-Yusof Ishak Institute, criticised the racial classification process which relies on the judgement of a few prominent individuals, as elitist. Questions were raised on the implications if the committee were to, in a hypothetical situation, reject a Malay candidate because he is Christian and not Muslim, as it could be seen as an infringement on a person's constitutional rights to religious freedom. Cabinet Minister Chan Chun Sing responded that it is up to individual racial communities to determine whom to accept as one of them, and no one would dispute the decision. MP Janil Puthucheary suggested that in such a case, the hypothetical non-Muslim Malay individual could still contest in the next open election.

Law professor Eugene Tan argued that as a reserved election prevents participation of qualified candidates from other races, the principle of meritocracy is not exercised fully. Tan also proposed that a race-based election can give rise to the belief that a racial community is entitled to have one of its own to be elected president, leading to the expectation for other public offices to be rotated amongst the races as well. Critics have highlighted that the more influential position of the prime minister has been held by the Chinese since Singapore's independence. When asked if the role of prime minister should be reserved for minorities at the IPS forum, Law Minister K. Shanmugam responded that Singapore has chosen "a mixed system", and that whether the country should "go all the way is a question of... what is doable, what the people will accept and also whether you need it... to strengthen our multiracial environment."

In addition, Professor Tan contends that a reserved election might just reinforce the alleged tendency of Singaporeans to vote along racial lines since the system will automatically produce a minority-race President at regular intervals if one is not elected. As noted by critics, the reserved election would generate unnecessary tension and lead to racial divide amongst Singaporeans.

An online petition circulated on the internet, calling for the election to be made open to all races.

=== Protest ===
A planned protest against the reserved Presidential election at the Speaker's Corner was abruptly cancelled as organiser Gilbert Goh believed that a police permit is required and he may not be granted one since the protest revolves around race issues, which, according to National Parks Board, may contravene the Public Order Act which stipulated that speakers must not speak about matters that may cause ill-will between different racial or religious groups.

Following his unsuccessful protest, Goh began organizing a silent sit-in protest to be held on 16 September 2017 at Hong Lim Park.

== Candidates ==
On 9 November 2016, Parliament passed an amendment to the Singapore Constitution. The amendment's passage meant that the 2017 presidential election would be reserved for members of the Malay community, who must be certified as such by a Community Committee. Applications for the presidential election opened on 1 June 2017, and were scheduled to close five days after the writ of election is issued in August, ahead of the elections in September.

The Elections Department declared Halimah Yacob to be the only eligible presidential candidate on 11 September.

Applications for the Certificate of Eligibility closed on 4 September 2017.

=== Eligible ===
Candidates	Background	Outcome
Halimah Yacob	A former member of the People's Action Party (PAP), Halimah served as Speaker of Parliament between 2013 and 2017, fulfilling a key criterion for candidates from the public sector. She was the Member of Parliament for Jurong GRC between 2001 and 2015 and Marsiling-Yew Tee GRC from 2015. During a debate on the Presidential Elections Amendment Bill on 6 February 2017, Cabinet Minister Chan Chun Sing addressed Halimah as "Madam President" twice instead of "Madam Speaker", leading to a widespread speculation that Halimah would be the PAP's preferred candidate for the reserved presidential election. Speaking after a community event in her constituency in July 2017, Halimah said, "I am thinking about it, of running for the presidency... The elected presidency is a very heavy responsibility and an important institution in Singapore, so it's not something that one should take lightly... So it needs a bit of time to think. But I must say at this moment, I have a lot of duties I have to perform, as Speaker, as MP. These duties are also very dear and important to me." On 7 August 2017, Halimah confirmed her bid for the presidency, and resigned from her position as Speaker of Parliament, and from PAP. She is viewed as the PAP's preferred candidate for the election. Her sudden resignation has sparked calls for a by-election, with the SDP criticising the government for abusing the GRC system where Halimah stood as the sole minority MP, indicating that it will "actively explore legal remedies" to compel it to call for a by-election. Halimah submitted her application on 30 August 2017. Halimah Yacob felt that the reserved presidency practices multi-racialism "in the context of meritocracy or opportunities for everyone". Halimah explained her view on meritocracy, stating, "All candidates have to qualify... The same criteria apply to everybody". Regarding commenters who have questioned the lower qualifying bar for public sector candidates like herself, Halimah said, "It is an open, transparent system... has been in place since 1991".	Application for the Certificate of Eligibility accepted.

=== Declared ineligible ===
Candidates	Background	Outcome
Mohamed Salleh Marican	A founding chairman and CEO of 2nd Chance Properties, the first company owned by a Malay-Muslim to be listed in Singapore. Salleh said "I believe I have done well for myself in business and would like to step up and give back to society in a much larger way" and that he "can also fulfill the call of most Singaporeans who desire a truly independent Elected President, one who is untainted by party politics". However, Salleh's company only has a registered shareholder equity S$254.3–263.23 million over the last three financial years, which falls short of the S$500 million needed to automatically qualify as an eligible candidate. Salleh submitted his application forms on 23 August 2017. Salleh stated that as a Presidential candidate: he is independent of any political party or organisation; he has the business acumen to safeguard the reserves; he is one who has empathy and compassion for the less fortunate; and he is prepared to stand up and be counted. He pledged to donate his President's salary to charity if he is elected.	Application for the Certificate of Eligibility rejected.
Farid Khan	Khan is the chairman of Bourbon Offshore Asia Pacific, a leading offshore oil and gas marine provider in the region, and founder of Bumi Subsea, an undersea operation firm. He also sits on the Careers@Maritime Steering Committee—an initiative supported by the Maritime and Port Authority of Singapore. Khan said, "I wish to serve the nation... to the best of my knowledge and ability. First and foremost, I am very concerned about the growing threat of radicalism. If elected, I will work closely with the Government and various organisations to resolve this issue... to strengthen the trust among the people regardless of race and religion... helping the needy, including troubled youth, to strengthen our social fabric... enhance our prosperity by creating more opportunities, including jobs... strengthen our families... to create a united, just and compassionate society." However, Bourbon Offshore Asia Pacific reportedly has a shareholders' equity value of US$300 million, which falls short of the S$500 million required to automatically qualify as an eligible candidate. Khan submitted his application a day after Salleh.	Application for the Certificate of Eligibility rejected.
Shirwin Eu	Eu was a private-hire driver who had failed to contest in the 2015 general election and the 2016 Bukit Batok SMC by-election as an independent candidate said, "I understand that this is a reserved election for minorities, for Malay candidates, but the verdict is not out yet... I think there's always a chance for the government to review its intentions. I am not sure if the Malay community wants to do that because there may be some repercussions and setbacks to it." In addition to not being a member of the Malay community, Eu also fails to meet any of the qualifying criteria, namely that one must hold a high-level civil service post or be the chairperson or CEO of a company with a shareholders' equity of S$500 million or more. Eu has also criticised the election being reserved for Malays, claiming that since "mathematics is the poorer subject for the Malay community", members of the Malay community are unable to "scrutinise the SWF, the Temasek and GIC". Eu submitted an application on 4 September 2017 before applications closed.	Application for the Certificate of Eligibility rejected.
Ooi Boon Ewe	Ooi was reportedly a former private tutor and property executive. Ooi submitted his application on the same day as Shirwin Eu. Ooi has previously attempted to receive his certificate of eligibility in the previous three Presidential elections (1999, 2005, 2011) but was unsuccessful due to lack of experience set forth by the constitution.	Application for the Certificate of Eligibility rejected.

=== Declined to be candidates ===
Candidates	Background
Bahren Shaari	The CEO of Bank of Singapore, initially did not rule out the possibility that he will run for the election. He said, "at the moment, my focus is on growing the business of Bank of Singapore with my team and deriving the synergies from our recent acquisition of the wealth and investment management business of Barclays Bank PLC." He added, "I'm humbled to have my name mentioned as a potential candidate... It is always a privilege and honour to serve the nation." Bahren was appointed as an alternate member of the Council of Presidential Advisers on 6 April 2017.
Abdullah bin Tarmugi	Former Speaker of Parliament and an MP for East Coast GRC from 1996 to 2011, said it was "unlikely" he will run in the election. "I had considered contesting earlier and many had in fact encouraged me to do so. But it is unlikely that I will contest. I have my reasons," he said, declining to elaborate.
Yaacob Ibrahim	Minister for Communications and Information, Muslim Affairs and in charge of Cyber Security, said, "I like to do policy work because it affects people's lives... "I'm happy in so far as I think I can effect change, to bring about a better Singapore. I'd like to remain in that position."

== Nomination day ==
On 11 September 2017, the Presidential Elections Commission announced Halimah Yacob as the only candidate issued with both the certificate of eligibility, and a community certificate.

As the only eligible candidate for the presidency, Halimah Yacob was declared the President-elect on Nomination Day, 13 September, after her nomination papers were found to be in order. The returning officer, Ng Wai Choong, declared on 12.04 p.m.,

Presidential Elections 2017. Results of nominations. Halimah Yacob is the only candidate, who has been nominated. I declare Halimah Yacob as the candidate elected to the office of president of the Republic of Singapore.

Speaking to her supporters at the Nomination Centre, Halimah remarked that it was a "proud moment for multi-culturalism, multi-racialism," and " multiculturalism is not just a slogan ... it really works in our society. Everyone has the chance to reach the highest office of land." She also said that she would strive to be a president for everyone, and even though it was a reserved election, she was not a reserved President.

Farid Khan, Salleh Marican and Tan Cheng Bock had congratulated her on her presidency.

Halimah was sworn in as Singapore's eighth President on 14 September at the Istana.

=== Reactions ===
Global media monitoring house Meltwater observed an increase in negative sentiment on social media surrounding the Presidential Elections from 11 to 12 September 2017, after the Elections Department announced that Halimah Yacob was the only candidate to be declared eligible for the election, effectively making the contest a walkover. The data shows 83% of negative sentiment and 17% of positive sentiment. In addition, critical backlash on the internet has led to the widespread use of the hashtag #NotMyPresident in Singapore. The Straits Times also reported on a counter-hashtag #halimahismypresident for Halimah's supporters.

Political analyst Eugene Tan believed that while the online criticisms were not directed at Halimah, the electoral process and the government was "seen as exclusive and disenfranchising". Along with Gillian Koh, deputy director of research at IPS, Tan believed that a contested presidency would have added to Halimah's legitimacy. Writer and political commentator Sudhir Thomas Vadaketh commented that Singaporeans are "unhappy that meritocracy and electoral fairness, core Singaporean values, have been eroded to fulfil perceived political goals." The Association of Women for Action and Research congratulated Halimah Yacob, the first female head of state of the country, but noted the tightening of the eligibility criteria for presidential candidates.

Political commentator and former Straits Times journalist Bertha Henson noted that the government had "opened the can of worms" as the elections have raised questions on Malay racial purity, in a country that often suppresses such discussions in fear of upsetting racial harmony. Others, such as former Nominated MP Calvin Cheng, lamented that eligible Malay candidates have failed to contest the election.

Activists called for a silent sit-in protest against the electoral process.
