= Ling Siew May =

First Lady of Singapore from 1993 to 1999

- 林秀梅
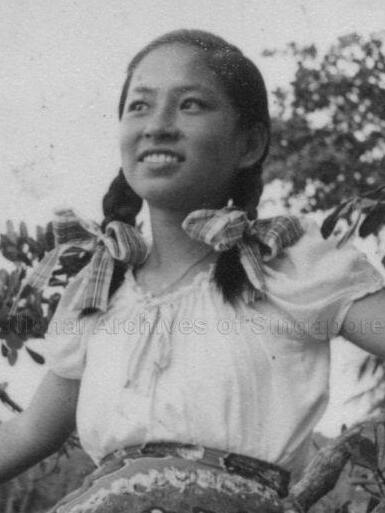
- Ling in 1951

First Lady of Singapore
- In office 2 September 1993 – 30 July 1999
- President: Ong Teng Cheong
- Preceded by: Koh Sok Hiong
- Succeeded by: Urmila Nandey

Personal details
- Born: 8 August 1937 Shanghai, China
- Died: 30 July 1999 (aged 61) National University Hospital, Singapore
- Spouse: Ong Teng Cheong (m. 1963)
- Children: 2
- Education: University of Adelaide

Ling Siew May (Chinese: 林秀梅; 8 August 1937 – 30 July 1999) was a Chinese-born Singaporean architect who was the First Lady of Singapore as the wife of President Ong Teng Cheong. Along with her husband, they co-founded ONG & ONG, an architecture and urban planning firm, in 1972.

Born in Shanghai, she moved to Singapore under British rule before the Japanese-occupied Singapore, separating her from her father and leaving her in an orphanage back in Shanghai. Ling moved back to Singapore in 1948 after reuniting with her father and studied at Nanyang Girls' High School and the University of Adelaide, becoming the first Asian woman to graduate from the university with a Bachelor in Architecture.

During her time as First Lady, she continued working as an architect at ONG & ONG, becoming the first working spouse. She died from cancer on 30 July 1999, the first person to die while serving as first lady of Singapore. Her death was reportedly the reason why Ong did not seek re-election less than a month later.

== Early life ==
Ling was born in 1937 in Shanghai, Republic of China, the fourth of six children. She moved to the Straits Settlements (present-day Singapore) when she was six as her father was posted there while he worked at a British firm. She was later sent to an orphanage in Shanghai after her father and her family were separated during the Japanese occupation of Singapore. In 1948, she returned to Singapore after her father had located them.

She studied at Nanyang Girls' High School. She later studied at the University of Adelaide studying architecture, which is where she met her future husband Ong Teng Cheong. In 1963, Ling became the first Asian woman to graduate from the University of Adelaide with a Bachelor in Architecture. She later married Ong in the same year.

== Career ==
In 1972, Ling and Ong founded ONG & ONG, an architecture firm, she was a principal partner.

In 1993, she became the 5th First Lady of Singapore after her husband Ong was elected president of Singapore. Despite becoming the First Lady, she continued her job as an architect at ONG & ONG, becoming the first working First Lady.

In 1999, Ling designed the new Nanyang Girls' High School campus at Linden Drive. She was also the chairperson of Nanyang Girls' board.

She died later that year whilst still serving as First Lady. Ling is the first First Lady to have died during their partner's presidency. Her illness is reportedly one of the reasons why Ong did not seek a re-election as he himself was in remission from lymphatic cancer.

== Personal life ==
She and Ong have two sons. In 1993, she stated that her elder son, Ong Tze Guan, was working in Singapore while her younger son, Ong Tze Boon, was doing his masters at Rice University in Houston, Texas. Tze Boon, also an architect, subsequently took the helm of ONG & ONG after the death of his parents and continues to run the firm.

=== Death ===
Ling died on 30 July 1999 at 11:25am after suffering from colon cancer for two and a half years at the National University Hospital, two weeks after Ong announced his desire to step down from the Presidency.

Her cheongsams were put up for a charity auction with money raised to go to the Retired Senior Volunteers Programme and Nanyang Primary School.
