= Singapore Monitor =

Defunct newspaper in Singapore

- Format: Broadsheet
- Owner: Singapore News and Publication Limited
- Editor-in-chief: Seah Chiang Nee
- Founded: 1981; 45 years ago
- Ceased publication: 14 July 1985; 40 years ago
- Language: English

Singapore Monitor was an English-language broadsheet daily newspaper in Singapore. It launched in 1981, and officially ceased publishing in 1985.

== History ==
In 1980, chief editor Seah Chiang Nee announced the proposed launch of a new English-language broadsheet daily newspaper in 1981.

Sin Chew Daily had a 26 percent stake in the newspaper and had planned to construct new buildings at Genting Lane, Singapore, to house both the Singapore Monitor and Chinese newspaper Nanyang Siang Pau.

In 1982, in a revamp of the press by the government, Sin Chew Daily and Nanyang Siang Pau merged into a single holding company and as a single company, held 52 percent of Singapore Monitor while the remaining 48 percent held by United Overseas Bank, OUB and Development Bank of Singapore equally. Singapore Monitor will hold the afternoon newspaper market with the transfer of the title New Nation and its Sunday title Sunday Nation from The Straits Times from 1 May onwards, lasting up to one year for a nominal fee of $10,000. As a result of the transfer of titles, Singapore Monitor will not compete in the morning newspaper market with The Straits Times for three years.

Newspaper circulation remains similar for weekday edition between New Nation and Singapore Monitor while Sunday Monitor, the Sunday edition of Singapore Monitor, fell below than that of Sunday Nation leading up to 1985.

On 11 July 1985, chairman of the Singapore Monitor, Chua Kim Yeow, announced that the Singapore Monitor will shut down on 14 July with Sunday Monitor the last issue of the company. The closure was due to the loss of funds, with its capital of $20 million used and a further $6 million owed to its parent company, Singapore News and Publication Limited.
