= Bahren Shaari =

Bahren Shaari is a Singaporean business executive who served as the chief executive officer of Bank of Singapore between 2015 and 2022. Under his leadership, the bank's reach has expanded around the world and has offices in Singapore, Europe, Dubai, and Hong Kong.

Bahren was also touted to be a potential candidate from the private sector for the 2017 presidential election by a number of Singaporean media, following the changes in the eligibility criteria for elected president. He declined to participate for the 2017 presidential election.

== Early life and education ==
Bahren was born and educated in Singapore. He studied in Sembawang Primary School, Ahmad Ibrahim Secondary School and Hwa Chong Junior College. He graduated from the National University of Singapore with a bachelor's degree in Accountancy.

== Career ==
Bahren started his career as an auditor at Coopers and Lybrand. After two years, he moved to the financial industry. He joined American Express in 1988 before moving to UBS AG Wealth Management in 1996, where he rose to become the managing director and Head of Southeast Asia and Australia team He then joined ING Asia Private Bank as Senior Managing Director and Global Head for the Southeast Asia market. In 2009 it was renamed Bank of Singapore after it was acquired by OCBC Bank in the same year.

In September 2016, Bahren was among the six recipients of the Institute of Banking and Finance Distinguished Fellows award.

== Other appointments ==
Bahren was appointed by the Monetary Authority of Singapore (MAS) to serve on the Corporate Governance Advisory Committee in Feb 2019.

In October 2018, he was named the Berita Harian Achiever of the Year in recognition of his professional achievements and contributions to the community. The award was given by Berita Harian, the sole Malay language broadsheet newspaper published in Singapore.

Following that, Bahren was one of 12 outstanding alumni honored at the NUS Business School Eminent Business Alumni Awards 2018.

In September 2016, Bahren was among the six recipients of the Institute of Banking and Finance Distinguished Fellows award.

He was appointed to the board of the Maritime and Port Authority of Singapore (MPA) in 2000, and stepped down in 2012. He has been an independent director of the Singapore Press Holdings since April 2012.

Bahren was awarded the Public Service Medal in 2008. He was conferred the Public Service Star Medal in 2018.

On 1 April 2017, Bahren was appointed as an alternate member to the Council of Presidential Advisers to serve a term of four years. He was then appointed as a full member on 9 January 2020.

== Personal life ==
Bahren's wife, June Rusdon, is the founder of Learning Vision Group and Chief Executive of BusyBees Asia. They have three children.
