= 1993 Singaporean presidential election =

- 28 August 1993
- Registered: 1,756,517
- Turnout: 94.48%
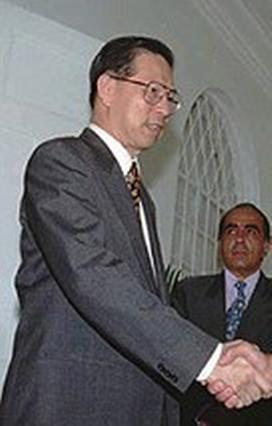

Nominee	Ong Teng Cheong	Chua Kim Yeow
Party	Independent	Independent
Popular vote	952,513	670,358
Percentage	58.69%	41.31%
President before election
Wee Kim Wee
Independent
Elected President
Ong Teng Cheong
Independent

Presidential elections were held in Singapore on 28 August 1993. Following amendments to the Constitution in 1991, presidential elections since then are to be directly elected by citizens for a six year term.

A non-partisan position, the candidates contesting in the election were Ong Teng Cheong and Chua Kim Yeow, who were all independents or had resigned from any political parties that they had previously been members of. They were all issued the Certificate of Eligibility (COE) as well as a community certificate to be able to contest in the election as per the eligibility requirements.

The 1993 presidential election was the only presidential election to date with only two candidates. Ong won a majority with 59% of the vote. He was inaugurated on 1 September as the fifth president of Singapore and the first to be directly elected.

== Background ==
=== Constitution amendments ===
In January 1991, the Constitution of Singapore was amended to provide for the popular election of the President for a six-year term. The creation of the elected presidency was a major constitutional and political change in Singapore's history. Under the revision, the president has veto powers over the spending of the national reserves, monetary policies and appointments in the civil service, government companies and the statutory boards. The president's veto powers checks the government by preventing the misuse of the national reserves and ensuring that the public service is impartial. The president must consult the Council of Presidential Advisers (CPA) on matters relating to past reserves and the appointment and removal of key office holders. The president may veto the government's proposals in the following areas:

1. Changes to the investment powers of the Central Provident Fund Board,
2. Restraining orders under the Maintenance of Religious Harmony Act,
3. Continued detention under the Internal Security Act, and
4. Refusal of investigations by the Corrupt Practices Investigation Bureau.

There are strict requirements for prospective election candidates, and whether a candidate meets the qualifications or not is decided by the Presidential Elections Committee (PEC). In short, candidates must satisfy either the public sector or private sector requirements. The public sector requirement has an automatic track where the candidate has held either a designated public office or chief executive position of a key statutory board or government company. The private sector requirement also has an automatic track where the candidate has held a chairmanship or CEO position of a company with S$100 million paid-up capital. Not withstanding the automatic tracks of the aforementioned, candidates could also be qualified on a deliberative track where their abilities and experiences have been assessed by the PEC to be equivalent to either of the public or private sector automatic track requirements.

By virtue of the transitional provisions in the Constitution of Singapore, Ong's predecessor Wee Kim Wee exercised, performed and discharged all the functions, powers and duties of an elected president as if he had been elected to the office of President by the citizens of Singapore.

== Candidates ==
=== Eligible ===
Candidates	Background	Outcome
Ong Teng Cheong	A former member of the governing People's Action Party, he was the Chairman of the People's Action Party and served as Deputy Prime Minister and Minister for Labour and was the Member of Parliament (MP) of Toa Payoh GRC between 1988 and 1993 and Kim Keat SMC between 1972 and 1988. He had resigned as Deputy Prime Minister and his role from the PAP before submitting his presidential eligibility forms.	Application for the Certificate of Eligibility Accepted.
Chua Kim Yeow	Chua served as the first local accountant-general of Singapore. He was a reluctant candidate and had to be persuaded by the government to stand for the presidential election and avoid an uncontested walkover.	Application for the Certificate of Eligibility Accepted.

=== Declared Ineligible ===
Candidates	Background	Outcome
J. B. Jeyaretnam	The Secretary-General of the Workers' Party, he became the first opposition politician since Singapore's independence in 1965, when he won Anson SMC in a by-election. He was re-elected during the 1984 general election, but lost his seat in Parliament in 1986 following a conviction for falsely accounting the party's funds. His presidential eligibility form was rejected.	Application for the Certificate of Eligibility rejected.
Tan Soo Phuan	A member of the opposition Workers' Party. He submitted his presidential eligibility forms but were ruled ineligible.	Application for the Certificate of Eligibility rejected.

=== Declined to be candidates ===
Candidates	Background
Wee Kim Wee	The incumbent and fourth president of Singapore, he decided not to seek re-election and retired after his second term had ended.
Chia Shi Teck	He was a nominated Member of Parliament who threw his hat in to help avert an uncontested walkover, but subsequently withdrew his application after Chua Kim Yeow stood in.

== Nomination Day ==
Candidates needed to obtain a Certificate of Eligibility from the Presidential Elections Committee, and pay an election deposit of S$18,000, three times that of a Parliamentary candidate, in order to file their nomination papers.

At the time of nomination, four candidates had applied for nominations but only two were eventually given, namely Chua Kim Yeow and Ong Teng Cheong. Workers' Party members J. B. Jeyaretnam and Tan Soo Phuan's application were unsuccessful. Ong had earlier resigned as Deputy Prime Minister, MP for Toa Payoh GRC, and party member of the People's Action Party (PAP) in order to contest in the election.

=== Endorsements ===
Chua was endorsed by some of the Cabinet and PAP members including then-Minister for Finance Richard Hu and Chairman and CEO of OCBC Bank Tony Tan, a future President-elect in 2011.

Ong received endorsements from influential leaders such as Prime Minister Goh Chok Tong and Senior Minister Lee Kuan Yew. One of the assentors for Ong was another president-elect in 2017 Halimah Yacob, who would later join politics in 2001.

=== Chua's Campaign ===
Chua was a reluctant candidate and had to be persuaded by the government to stand in, so that the election would not be an uncontested walkover, and at the same time, the electorate could choose between two good candidates.

The 10-day campaign was supposed to be a "gentlemen's election", free of flag-waving and noisy rallies. However, Chua took it to the extreme, unconventionally urging supporters not to campaign for him. He appeared on TV only twice – once avoiding any mention of himself or his views, and even announced on polling day that Ong was the better candidate.

== Results ==
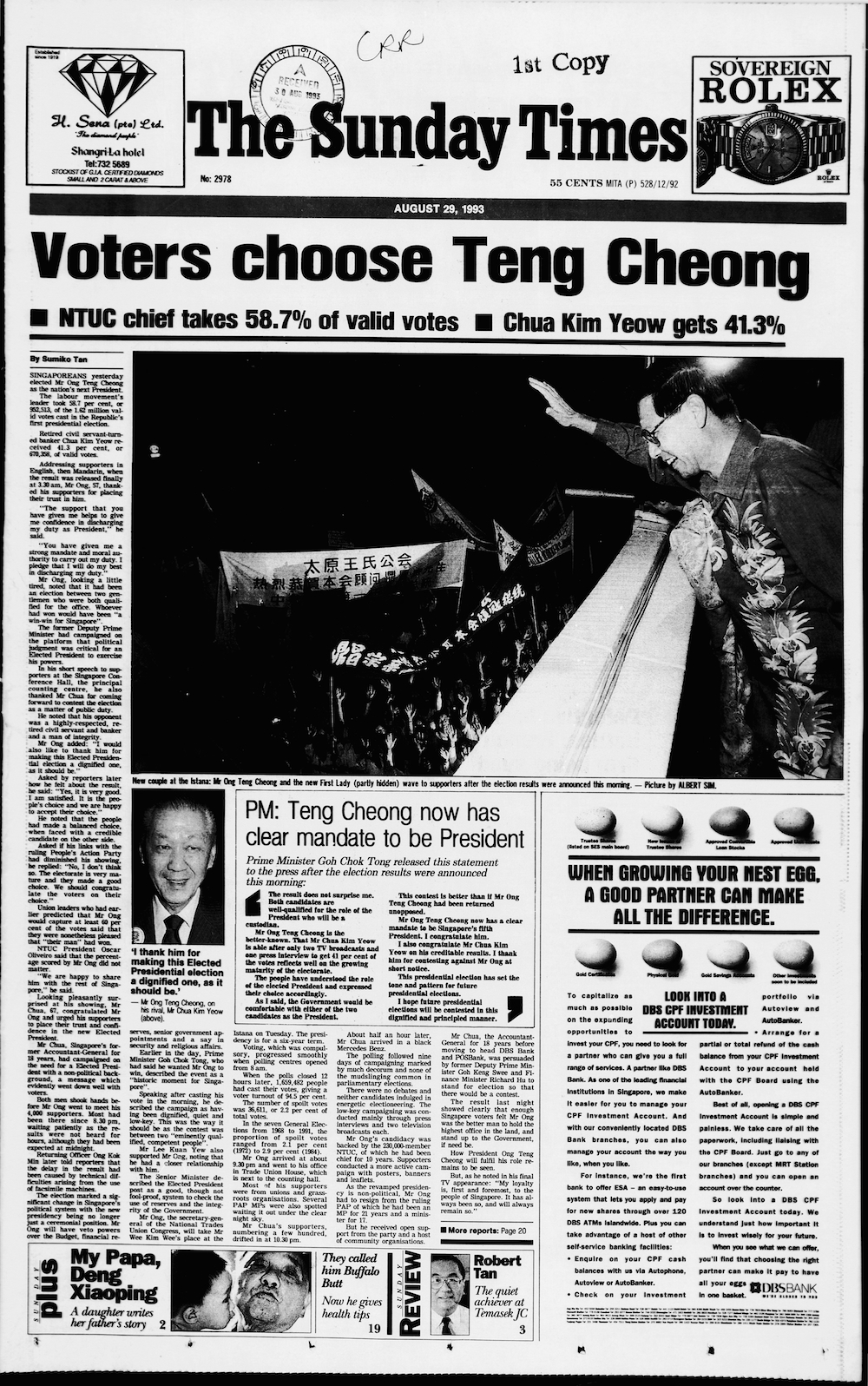
"Voters choose [Ong] Teng Cheong." The headline on page 1 of The Sunday Times on 29 August

After polls closed, the Returning Officer Ong Kok Min officially declared Ong Teng Cheong as Singapore's first president-elect having secured 58.69 percent of the valid votes cast. The announcement was made at the Singapore Conference Hall, the designated venue for the official tabulation and declaration of results.

His opponent, Chua Kim Yeow garnered a noteworthy 41.3 percent of the vote. This outcome was considered unexpectedly strong, given his low public profile and limited campaigning efforts. Analysts attributed his performance to a segment of the electorate that frequently withheld support for the ruling PAP during general elections and may have viewed Chua as a viable alternative or a symbolic protest candidate.

Candidate	Votes	%
Ong Teng Cheong	952,513	58.69
Chua Kim Yeow	670,358	41.31
Total	1,622,871	100.00
Valid votes	1,622,871	97.79
Invalid/blank votes	36,611	2.21
Total votes	1,659,482	100.00
Registered voters/turnout	1,756,517	94.48
Source: Elections Department
