= Chua Kim Yeow =

Singaporean banker (1926–2016)

Chua Kim Yeow PPA(P) PPA(E)
- 蔡锦耀
- Chua in 2012
- Born: 28 January 1926; Straits Settlements (present-day Chinatown, Singapore)
- Died: 21 August 2016 (aged 90); Singapore General Hospital, Singapore
- Occupation: Banker
- Spouse: Seah Sok Meng (m. 1954; died 2012)
- Children: 4
- Awards: Public Administration Silver Medal, 1964; Public Administration Gold Medal, 1975

Chua Kim Yeow PPA(P) PPA(E) (28 January 1926 – 21 August 2016) was a Singaporean banker and presidential candidate at the 1993 presidential election, the first election in Singapore to have a president elected by citizens instead of Parliament. Chua was unsuccessful, only garnering 41.31% of the vote as compared to Ong Teng Cheong's 58.69%, who became the fifth president.

A civil servant, Chua also served multiple roles at many companies along with becoming the first local accountant-general, serving in that role for 18 years.

== Early life and education ==
Chua was born on 28 January 1926 in the Straits Settlements (present-day Chinatown, Singapore). His father was a stevedore subcontractor who worked for the Singapore Harbour Board. In 1943, following his father's death, Chua became an odd job worker to support his mother and three siblings.

He was a top student in Gan Eng Seng School and attended Raffles Institution for two years before ending his studies due to the Japanese occupation. In 1947, Chua passed the London Matriculation External Examination and later the UK Association of Certified Accountants in 1953. In 1954, Chua worked at the Income Tax Service. In 1956, he was transferred to the accountant-general's department, reaching the top position in five years.

== Career ==
=== Civil service career ===
In 1961, Chua succeeded a British accountant as accountant-general, becoming the first local accountant-general. He served as accountant-general for 18 years. In 1979, he retired from civil service and became executive chairman of the Development Bank of Singapore (DBS Bank), leaving in 1986 and becoming executive chairman of POSB Bank, succeeding Tan Chok Kian before leaving in February 1993. In 1981, he became the head of the Securities Industry Council. Chua was also director of several companies such as Singapore Press Holdings and City Developments Limited.

Chua was also involved in launching the Singapore dollar, having served as deputy chairman on the Board of Commissioners of Currency from 1967 to 1979. In 1985, serving as chairman, Chua announced the dissolution of The Singapore Monitor. In 1990, Chua was appointed director of Asia Pacific Breweries Ltd. In December 1993, Chua was appointed chairman of Stock Exchange of Singapore.

=== 1993 presidential election ===
Chua used a flower as his campaign's symbol.

In the 1993 presidential election, presidents were to be elected by popular vote instead of by Parliament. To prevent an uncontested walkover, former minister Goh Keng Swee and then-finance minister Richard Hu persuaded Chua to stand in the election against Ong Teng Cheong. Chua initially refused, stating that he considered Ong to be a "far superior candidate." However, he later decided to stand as a candidate, stating that it was "an act of public duty".

Chua submitted his Certification of Eligibility on 18 August. His nomination was proposed by Wee Kok Wah and seconded by Lam Fong Loi. Chua's assenters included Tan Boon Teik, Mah Kah Eng, Frances Wong Lai Yong, and V. T. Arasu. Chua was supported by opposition parties such as the Workers' Party and the Singapore Democratic Party as Ong had a background in the People's Action Party, the ruling party of the government at that time.

Chua decided not to campaign at all, only having two public appearances on television. In his first television appearance, Chua stated that the reason he did not campaign was due to a lack of funds and that he wasn't politically affiliated. Due to his lack of campaigning, his supporters campaigned for him. One supporter made flyers out of The Straits Times pages and distributed them using fax. Supporters also made "Vote Chua" car stickers but had to stop due to rules that the stickers did not bear the Returning Officer stamp.

On 28 August, results for the presidential election were announced with Chua losing the election with 41.31% of the vote as compared to Ong's 58.69%. Chua stated that he was surprised by the number of votes he had received, with Ong stating about Chua that he was a "very credible candidate".

=== Post-election career ===
In 1994, Chua quit as director to Singapore Press Holdings, Asia Pacific Breweries Ltd, and Times Publishing Ltd. He was briefly re-elected director of Asia Pacific Breweries Ltd but only temporarily till a replacement was found. This was reportedly done to avoid conflict of interests between the companies and his role as chairman of Stock Exchange of Singapore. Chua also served as chairman of Stamford Tyres from 2000 to 2013.

== Personal life ==
In 1964, Chua was awarded the Public Administration Silver Medal and, in 1975, was awarded the Public Administration Gold Medal. He married his wife Seah Sok Meng, a school teacher, in 1954 and had four daughters. Seah died in 2012.

=== Death ===
On 21 August 2016, Chua died at the Singapore General Hospital of pneumonia. He had been hospitalized there since early August. He was survived by four children, three grandchildren, and one great-grandchild.
