= Mohamed Salleh Marican =

Mohamed Salleh Marican Salleh Marican
- Born: Mohamed Salleh bin Kadir Mohideen Saibu Maricar; 15 September 1949 (age 77); Singapore
- Occupations: Founder and CEO of Second Chance Properties Ltd
- Spouse: Sapiyah Abu Bakar
- Children: Nadia; Radiah; Sofia; Amal
- Awards: 1988 - Inaugural SMCCI/BH Malay Businessman of the Year Award; 1996 - Lianhe Zaobao and the Entrepreneurship Development Centre of Nanyang Technological University Entrepreneurship Excellence Award; 2011 - Berita Harian Achiever of the Year Award; 2012 - Ernst & Young Entrepreneur of the Year - Business and Consumer Products; 2013 - Singapore Corporate Awards Best Chief Executive Officer Award

Mohamed Salleh bin Kadir Mohideen Saibu Maricar (born 15 September 1949), usually referred to as Mohamed Salleh Marican or Salleh Marican, is the Founder and CEO of Second Chance Properties Ltd, a listed company on the Singapore Stock Exchange. His company is the first owned by a Malay and Muslim to be listed in Singapore.

== Early life and education ==
Born on 15 September 1949 in Joo Chiat, Salleh is the third of six siblings. His father, Kadir Marican, was from Nagore district, Pondicherry state, India, while his mother, Salmah Mar’i.e., came from Indonesia. His father died when he was 15 years old. He attended Victoria School from 1962 to 1967. Knowing that he was likely to fail the A-Level Examinations, he dropped out of school before the examinations to save 70% of the examination fees.

== Career ==
Salleh has more than 48 years of retail business experience. He first went into menswear tailoring in 1974, and started his menswear label 2nd Chance, which expanded to 25 outlets in Singapore and Malaysia by 1988. In 1992, he diversified into Malay women's fashion brand First Lady. He also started a jewellery business Golden Chance and went into the property business in the late 1990s.

Salleh later founded 2nd Chance Properties of which he is chairman and CEO. 2nd Chance Properties is then listed on the Singapore Exchange in 1997, becoming the first company owned by a Malay/Muslim to be listed in Singapore.

== 2017 presidential election ==
On 31 May 2017, he announced his intention to run for the Presidency of Singapore, which was reserved for Malay candidates. Salleh said "I believe I have done well for myself in business and would like to step up and give back to society in a much larger way." and that he "can also fulfill the call of most Singaporeans who desire a truly independent Elected President, one who is untainted by party politics".

Salleh applied on the premise that although Second Chance Properties' shareholder equity was between $254.3 million and $263.25 million in the past three financial years, which fells short of the $500 million required for automatic qualification as a candidate, it did not prevent the Presidential Elections Committee to qualify him, if it is satisfied that he has the experience and ability to effectively carry out the functions and duties of the office of the President. Nonetheless, on 11 September 2017, the Committee rejected his application, issuing only one Certificate of Eligibility to Halimah Yacob.

== Salleh Marican Foundation ==
Salleh founded the Salleh Marican Foundation with the intention to donate a total sum of SGD $100 million to support select causes in Singapore and other countries. The Salleh Marican Foundation was incorporated in Singapore on 18 November 2021.

== Personal life ==
Salleh is married to Sapiyah Abu Bakar. They have four children.

== Achievements ==
- 1988 – Inaugural SMCCI/BH Malay Businessman of the Year Award
- 1996 – Lianhe Zaobao and the Entrepreneurship Development Centre of Nanyang Technological University Entrepreneurship Excellence Award
- 2011 – Berita Harian Achiever of the Year Award
- 2012 – Ernst & Young Entrepreneur of the Year – Business and Consumer Products
- 2013 – Singapore Corporate Awards Best Chief Executive Officer Award
