= Ong Teng Cheong =

President of Singapore from 1993 to 1999

Ong Teng Cheong GCMG
- 王鼎昌
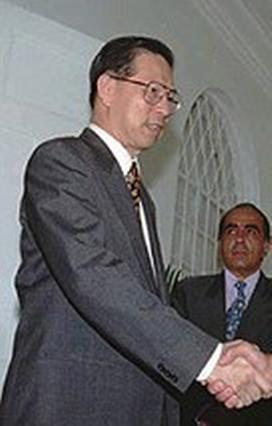
- Ong in 1997

5th President of Singapore
- In office 1 September 1993 – 1 September 1999
- Prime Minister: Goh Chok Tong
- Preceded by: Wee Kim Wee
- Succeeded by: S. R. Nathan

3rd Deputy Prime Minister of Singapore
- In office 2 January 1985 – 16 August 1993 Serving with Goh Chok Tong (1985–1990) and Lee Hsien Loong (1990–1993)
- Prime Minister: Lee Kuan Yew; Goh Chok Tong
- Preceded by: Goh Keng Swee; S. Rajaratnam
- Succeeded by: Lee Hsien Loong; Tony Tan

2nd Chairman of the People's Action Party
- In office 5 January 1981 – 16 August 1993
- Preceded by: Toh Chin Chye
- Succeeded by: Tony Tan

Secretary-General of the National Trades Union Congress
- In office May 1983 – 1 September 1993
- Deputy: Goh Chee Wee
- Preceded by: Lim Chee Onn
- Succeeded by: Lim Boon Heng

Minister for Labour
- In office 5 January 1981 – 9 May 1983
- Prime Minister: Lee Kuan Yew
- Preceded by: Ong Pang Boon
- Succeeded by: E. W. Barker

Minister for Communications
- In office 1 July 1977 – 9 May 1983
- Prime Minister: Lee Kuan Yew
- Preceded by: Lim Kim San
- Succeeded by: Ong Pang Boon

Member of the Singapore Parliament for Toa Payoh GRC
- In office 21 August 1991 – 16 August 1993
- Preceded by: Constituency established
- Succeeded by: Constituency abolished

Member of the Singapore Parliament for Kim Keat SMC
- In office 2 September 1972 – 14 August 1991
- Preceded by: Constituency established
- Succeeded by: Constituency abolished

Personal details
- Born: Ong Teng Cheong; 22 January 1936 Singapore, Straits Settlements
- Died: 8 February 2002 (aged 66) Tanglin, Singapore
- Cause of death: Lymphoma
- Resting place: Mandai Crematorium and Columbarium
- Party: Independent (1999–2002)
- Other political affiliations: People's Action Party (1972–1993)
- Spouse: Ling Siew May (m. 1963; died 1999)
- Children: 2
- Education: University of Adelaide (BArch); University of Liverpool (MCD)
- Occupation: Politician; union leader; civil servant; architect

Ong Teng Cheong (Note: Chinese: 王鼎昌; Pe̍h-ōe-jī: Ông Téng-chhiong; pinyin: Wáng Dǐngchāng) GCMG (22 January 1936 – 8 February 2002) was a Singaporean architect and politician who served as the fifth president of Singapore from 1993 and 1999. A former member of the People's Action Party (PAP), he served as Member of Parliament (MP) for Kim Keat of Toa Payoh Group Representation Constituency (GRC) from 1991 to 1993 and Kim Keat Single Member Constituency from 1972 to 1991 .

Born when Singapore was part of the Straits Settlements, Ong was educated at the University of Adelaide, where he studied architecture. He later received a Colombo Plan scholarship and earned a master's degree in urban planning from the University of Liverpool. In 1967, Ong joined the Ministry of National Development (MND) as a town planner. After four years in the civil service, he resigned in 1971 and established his own architectural firm, Ong & Ong Architects & Town Planners, with his wife Ling Siew May who was also an architect.

Ong became involved in politics in the early 1970s, joining the People's Action Party (PAP). He served as PAP's Chairman from 1981 to 1993 and held ministerial positions including Minister for Communications (1978–1981), Minister for Labour (1981–1983) and Deputy Prime Minister (1985–1993). In Parliament, Ong was best known for advocating the construction of the Mass Rapid Transit (MRT), the largest construction project in Singapore's history at the time. A union leader, he was also the Secretary-General of the National Trades Union Congress (NTUC) from 1983 to 1993.

On 16 August 1993, Ong resigned from both the PAP and Parliament to contest the 1993 presidential election, winning 58.7% of the vote. He was nicknamed the "People's President" for being Singapore's first directly elected president and was sworn in on 1 September 1993, concurrently leaving his position at NTUC. He decided not to run for a second term as president in 1999, in part due to the illness and death of his wife. He was succeeded by S. R. Nathan. Ong died from lymphoma in 2002 at the age of 66.

== Early life and education ==
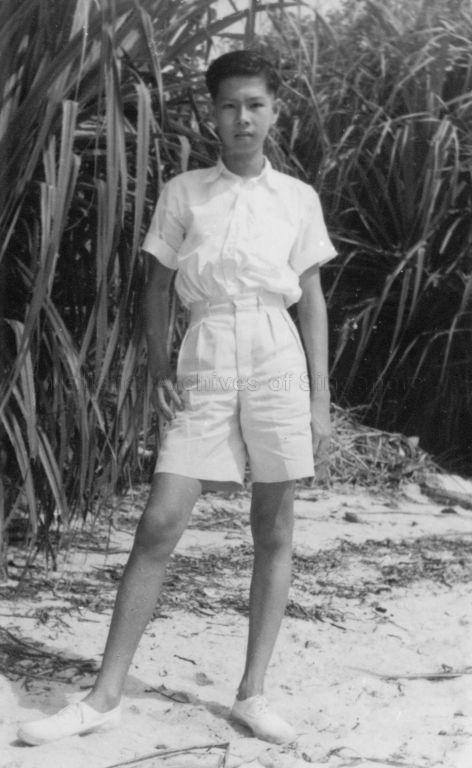
Ong in 1951

Ong was born on 22 January 1936 to Ong Keng Wee and Chung Lai Heng in Singapore, the second of five children from a middle-class family. His English-educated father Ong Keng Wee felt that the Chinese language was important if one ever wanted to become successful in business at the time and thus sent all of his children to Chinese-medium schools.

Ong graduated with distinctions from The Chinese High School in 1955. Having received a Chinese-language education, Ong saw little opportunity for advancing his studies in the University of Malaya, as English was the university's language medium.

In 1956, with the help of his father's friends, Ong ventured abroad. Those years were to shape both his beliefs and passions. Ong studied architecture at the University of Adelaide along with his childhood sweetheart and future wife, Ling Siew May. In 1965, Ong received a Colombo Plan scholarship to pursue a master's degree in urban planning at the University of Liverpool and graduated in 1967.

=== Pre-political career ===
Upon graduation, Ong worked as an architect in Adelaide, Australia.

In 1967, Ong joined the Ministry of National Development (MND) as a town planner. After four years of civil service, Ong resigned in 1971, and started his own architectural firm, Ong & Ong Architects & Town Planners, with his wife.

== Political career ==
=== MP and Minister ===
Ong's political career spanned 21 years. He was a Member of Parliament (MP), Cabinet minister and Deputy Prime Minister, before he resigned to become the first elected President of Singapore in 1993.

Ong's political beginnings started when he got involved in the grassroots activities in Seletar and was then introduced to Prime Minister Lee Kuan Yew. The People's Action Party (PAP) subsequently fielded him as a PAP candidate contesting in Kim Keat SMC during the 1972 general election.

==== Mass Rapid Transit (MRT) ====
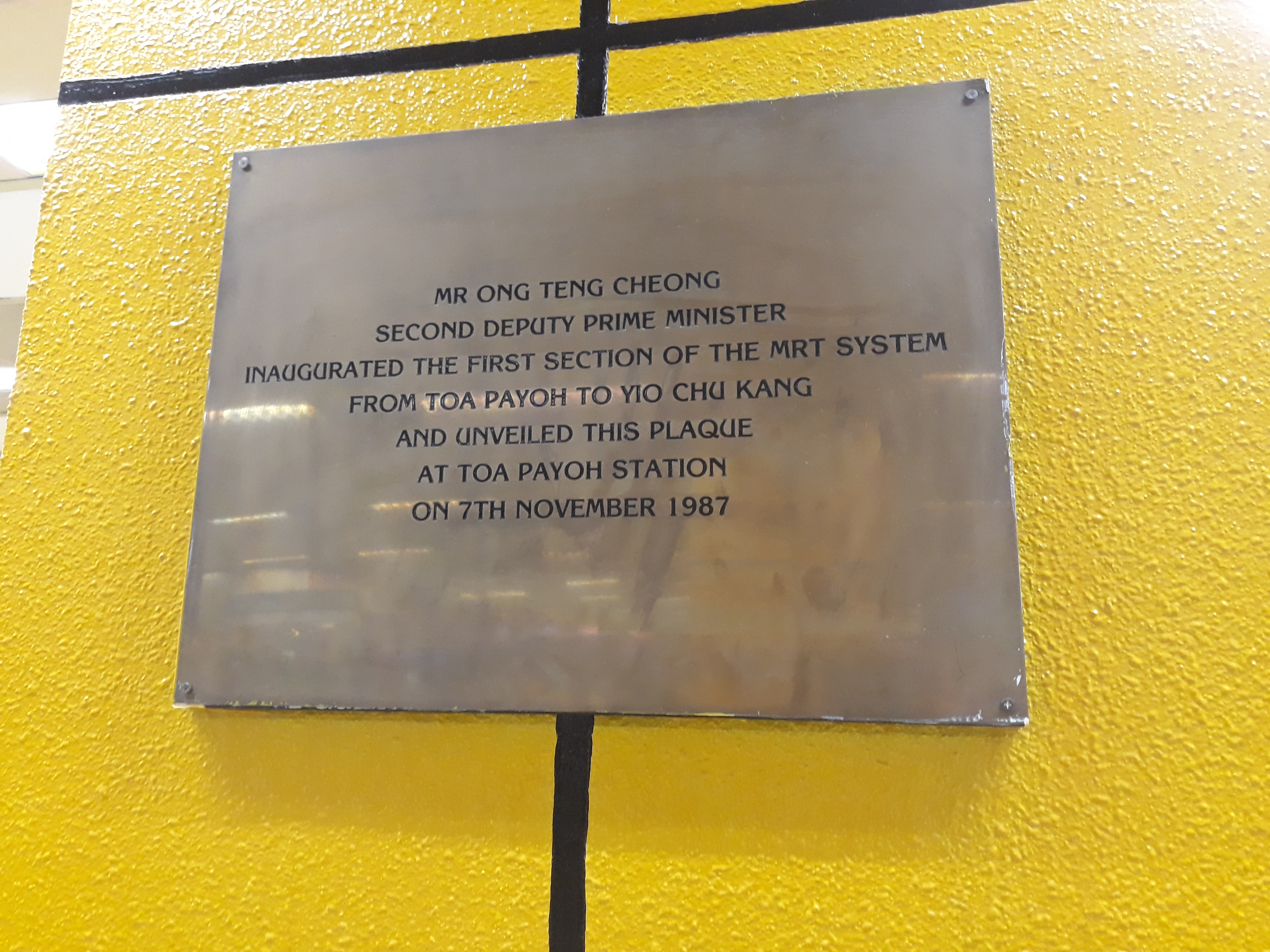
A plaque at Toa Payoh MRT station commemorating the opening of the first phase of the Singapore MRT, which was inaugurated by Ong

His first political appointment came just three years later when he was appointed Senior Minister of State for Communications. At that time, he was notable for pushing for an extensive rail network in the country, now known as the Mass Rapid Transit (MRT), the largest construction project in Singapore's history. During his tenure as Minister for Communications, Ong continued to be a proponent and advocate of the MRT system, often coming at odds with his fellow political colleagues who were against such an idea. He was subsequently appointed Second Deputy Prime Minister in 1985.

The origins of the MRT was first derived from a forecast by the country's planners back in 1967 which stated the need for a rail-based urban transport system by 1992. However, opposition from the government on the feasibility of the MRT from prominent ministers, among them Finance Minister Goh Keng Swee and Trade and Industry Minister Tony Tan, nearly shuttered the programme due to financial grounds and concerns of jobs saturation in the construction industry.

Following a debate on whether a bus-only system would be more cost-effective, Ong came to the conclusion that an all-bus system would be inadequate, as it would have to compete for road space in a land-scarce country. Ong was an architect and town planner by training and through his perseverance and dedication became the main figure behind the initial construction of the system. Ong and other pro-rail advocates eventually won the argument, with the MRT being given the go-ahead in May 1982.

=== Secretary-General of the NTUC ===
==== Replacing Lim Chee Onn ====
In 1983, Ong succeeded Lim Chee Onn as Secretary-General of the National Trades Union Congress (NTUC). Historically, the NTUC, representing non-communist trade unions in Singapore, maintained a notably close relationship with the ruling People's Action Party (PAP) as part of a tripartite system involving the government, employers, and unions. This alliance was instrumental to the PAP's consolidation of power during the 1960s.

Despite this longstanding partnership, tensions between the NTUC leadership and the grassroots union base had begun to surface by the 1980s. In 1982, Lim, then still Secretary-General, publicly affirmed the deep historical ties between the two organisations, declaring that the "PAP and the NTUC came from the same mother—the struggle with the communists and the colonialists." Nevertheless, internal frictions were becoming more pronounced. According to political analyst Michael Barr, the NTUC leadership had come to be dominated by technocrats aligned with the PAP, many of whom were seen as distant from the traditional labour movement. Older grassroots union leaders increasingly felt sidelined in decision-making processes.

Prime Minister Lee Kuan Yew expressed concern that Lim, despite being his protégé, was not successfully integrating the new generation of elite professionals and scholars with the rank-and-file union leadership. This failure to harmonise the NTUC's leadership structure led to growing unease among the grassroots. Lim's predecessors included figures such as Devan Nair, the NTUC's founder and a prominent democratic socialist from the PAP's Old Guard, and Phey Yew Kok, a powerful union figure instrumental in bringing Chinese unions into the NTUC fold during the 1970s. Phey, however, resigned in 1980 amidst a corruption scandal and subsequently fled the country.

Discontent with the NTUC's leadership became more visible in the early 1980s. The United Workers of Petroleum Industry (UWPI), along with the NTUC Triennial Delegates' Conference, publicly opposed government efforts to promote the establishment of house unions, a move that provoked political concern within the PAP leadership. In an open letter, Lee informed Lim that he would be reassigned to head a government ministry, and that Ong would assume the position of Secretary-General of the NTUC. Though the role of Secretary-General was typically held by a Cabinet member, Ong's appointment was notable. At the time, he served concurrently as Minister for Labour and Chairman of the PAP, and was widely regarded as a potential successor to Lee.

==== Implicit pact with unions ====
As Secretary-General of the NTUC, Ong made significant progress in mending the strained relationship between the unions and the government, an area where his predecessor Lim had struggled. Within months of his appointment, Ong confronted the leadership of the UWPI, which had previously resisted the government's push for house unions. Their opposition was swiftly reversed, and by 1985, the NTUC Triennial Delegates' Conference formally endorsed the policy. Barr observed that Ong demonstrated a strong "mastery of institutional power".

Despite the prohibition on strikes and trade union negotiations over key employment matters such as promotion, transfer, dismissal and retrenchment, which were issues that had historically triggered most labour disputes, the Singaporean government had, since the 1960s, implemented broad protections for workers' welfare and safety. Disputes were typically resolved through the Industrial Arbitration Court, which was empowered to provide both binding arbitration and voluntary mediation. However, concerns persisted within the union grassroots about their declining political influence and the increasing dominance of PAP technocrats within the NTUC.

These concerns were voiced by figures such as Peter Vincent, NTUC President from 1980 to 1984, who suggested that PAP technocrats should remain in advisory roles until they earned the trust of the union movement. In response, Ong actively sought to rebuild trust by increasing consultation with union leaders and reversing the trend of excluding grassroots representatives from top NTUC leadership. His approach was seen as a deliberate effort to restore the legitimacy and inclusiveness of the union hierarchy.

Ong also stood out for his vigorous advocacy on behalf of the labour movement. Unlike his predecessor, he was deeply involved in union affairs and pushed the limits of what the government would tolerate in union activism. According to Barr, such an approach would not have been acceptable under another leader, but Ong's personal credibility and close relationship with the government afforded him greater leeway. In return for his assertive representation of union interests, the NTUC maintained its overall alignment with the government's core industrial relations strategies.

In January 1986, Ong sanctioned a strike in the shipping industry, the first for about a decade in Singapore, believing it was necessary as "[the] management were taking advantage of the workers". However, he did not inform the Cabinet beforehand out of fear that the Cabinet would prevent him from going ahead with the strike. Ong recalled in a 2000 interview in Asiaweek: "Some of them were angry with me about that... the Minister for Trade and Industry was very angry, his officers were upset. They had calls from America, asking what happened to Singapore?" Minister for Trade and Industry Tony Tan, vigorously opposed Ong's decision to sanction the strike, being concerned with investors' reactions to a perceived deterioration of labour relations or an impact on foreign direct investment (FDI) needed for jobs creation. Ong viewed the strike as a success, and according to Barr, Ong justified his commitment "in Confucian terms" in a "notion akin to noblesse oblige".

==== Demonstration at the United States Embassy ====
As Secretary-General of the NTUC, Ong also organised a 4,000-strong demonstration at the United States Embassy in protest against the United States First Secretary E. Mason Hendrickson's encouragement of dissident lawyers to stand for election against the PAP.

=== Presidency ===
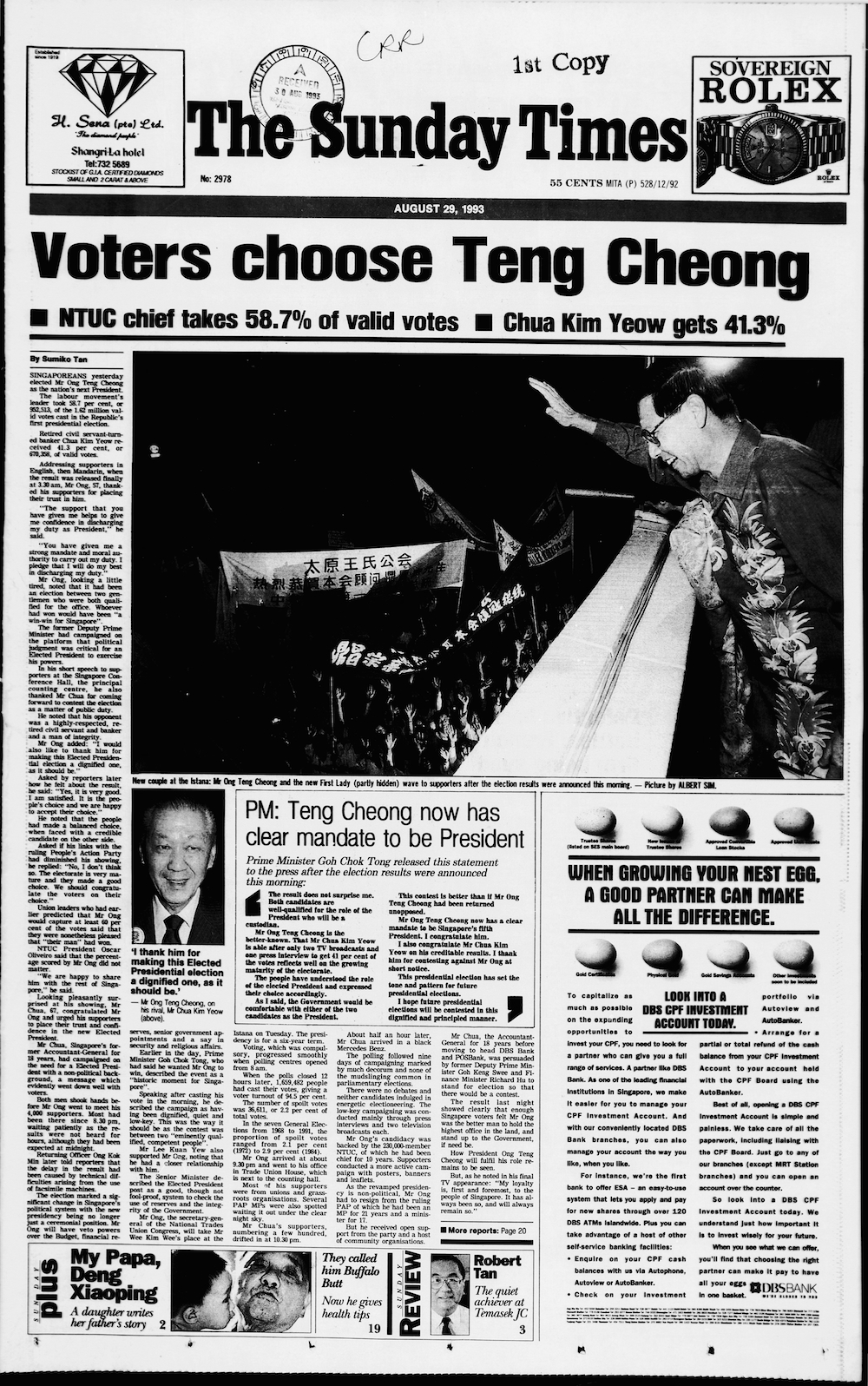
"Voters choose [Ong] Teng Cheong." The headline on page 1 of The Sunday Times on 29 August

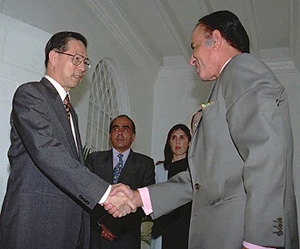
Ong with President of Argentina Carlos Menem in 1997

In August 1993, Ong resigned from the Cabinet, the PAP and his position as Secretary-General of the NTUC in order to contest the 1993 Singaporean presidential election. Nominated by the NTUC and with the endorsement of the PAP, Ong contested against Chua Kim Yeow, a former accountant-general in Singapore's first-ever presidential election. Out of 1,756,517 votes cast, Ong received 952,513 votes while Chua garnered 670,358, despite having conducted a notably modest campaign and possessing a lower public profile. Ong was consequently inaugurated as the first elected President of Singapore, and in accordance with convention, was appointed ex officio Chancellor of both the National University of Singapore (NUS) and the Nanyang Technological University (NTU).

However, shortly after assuming office, Ong encountered significant tension with the government regarding access to detailed information on Singapore's national reserves. While the government initially contended that it would require 56-man-years to compile a precise valuation of immovable assets, Ong consulted both the accountant-general and the auditor-general and concluded that such a valuation could be reasonably expedited. A preliminary list was eventually produced, though incomplete, and it ultimately took the government three years to deliver the information he had requested. In an interview with Hong Kong's Asiaweek six months after leaving office, Ong explained that his insistence on auditing the reserves was guided by his constitutional duty as an elected president to safeguard national assets, both liquid and immovable. He also recounted an instance where he was informed through the press that the government intended to sell the Post Office Savings Bank (POSB) to The Development Bank of Singapore Limited (DBS) without notifying him in advance, despite the bank's reserves falling under presidential protection. He described the move as procedurally inappropriate, and although he eventually intervened, the sale proceeded regardless.

Ong also had described he had a "long list" of problems with the Government with setting out their relationship due to newly created office with no precedence. They were eventually resolved after working together to establish principles and procedures. Ong also said that some ministers and public office had felt his office as a "nuisance" initially.

In 1998, Ong was appointed an Honorary Knight Grand Cross of the Order of St Michael and St George (GCMG) by Queen Elizabeth II in recognition of his public service.

Ong's presidency was also distinguished by his patronage of charitable and cultural initiatives, most notably the founding of the President's Star Charity, an annual event that has benefitted numerous charities, arts organisations and youth groups. In his final year in office, he famously performed a piano rendition of Teresa Teng's "The Moon Represents My Heart" alongside Mediacorp artistes Evelyn Tan and Kym Ng. Ong stepped down from the presidency at the age of 63.

In July 1999, Ong announced his intention to step down from the presidency. He stated that he had achieved the objectives he had set for his term and wished to spend more time with his family. His decision was also partly influenced by his wife's illness. He also indicated that he would most likely not return to politics.

In his farewell speech on 30 August 1999, Ong remarked that "having a good government is better than having a good President to check on a bad government", expressing confidence in Singapore's leadership and its governance over the past 35 years.

== Personal life ==
Ong met his future wife, Ling Siew May, during a Christmas party while they were still studying in secondary school. They both went to study architecture at the University of Adelaide together. They married in 1963. Ong and Ling occasionally recite Chinese poetry and verses they learnt during their younger days.

In 1992, Ong was diagnosed with lymphoma which went into remission. It reoccurred in mid 1998 which Ong received chemotherapy. It went into remission halfway through his course of chemotherapy which he completed the whole course.

Ling died on 30 July at the National University Hospital, two weeks after Ong announced his desire to step down from the Presidency.

== Death ==
Ong died in his sleep from lymphoma on 8 February 2002, at the age of 66, at his residence in Dalvey Estate at Tanglin at about 8:14pm Singapore Standard Time (UTC+08:00) after he had been discharged from hospital a few days earlier. As a mark of respect, state flags at all government buildings were flown at half-mast, including the Istana, on 11 February instead of on 12 February, the day of Ong's funeral, to avoid state flags being flown at half-mast on the first day of Chinese New Year.

== Legacy ==
Ong was also known as "The People's President", as he was the first president to be directly elected by Singaporeans.

- The Ong Teng Cheong Professorship in Music was launched by National University of Singapore on 2 October 2002.
- The Ong Teng Cheong Student Activities and Leadership Training Centre was opened in his alma mater Hwa Chong Institution on 21 March 2007.
- The Singapore Institute of Labour Studies, which opened in 1990, was renamed the Ong Teng Cheong Institute of Labour Studies in March 2002. It was later renamed as the Ong Teng Cheong Labour Leadership Institute.
- In August 2017, a mountain located in south eastern Kazakhstan near the Kyrgyz border, was named Ong Teng Cheong peak.
- Two of his autobiographies have been published. The first book, Route to Istana was published a year after being President in 1994 written in Chinese. The second book named: Ong Teng Cheong: Planner, Politician, President was published in 2005 after his death.

Political offices
Preceded by S Rajaratnam	Deputy Prime Minister of Singapore; 1985–1993	Succeeded by Tony Tan Keng Yam
Preceded by Wee Kim Wee	President of Singapore; 1993–1999	Succeeded by Sellapan Ramanathan
Party political offices
Preceded by Toh Chin Chye	Chairman, PAP; 1981–1993	Succeeded by Tony Tan Keng Yam
Preceded by None	Nonpartisan nominee for President of Singapore; 1993 (won)	Succeeded by S. R. Nathan
Trade union offices
Preceded by Lim Chee Onn	Secretary-General, National Trades Union Congress; 1983–1993	Succeeded by Lim Boon Heng
