= List of diplomatic missions of Canada =

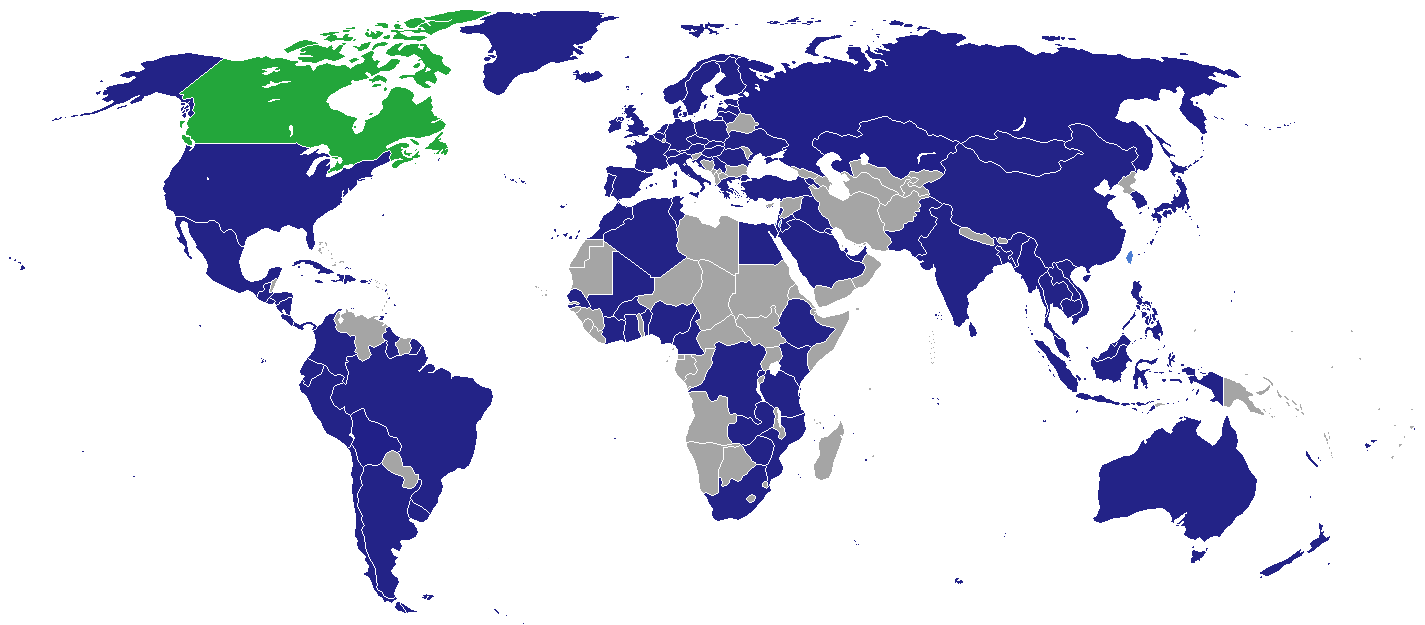
Diplomatic missions of Canada Countries that host a Canadian Embassy or High Commission Interests section and other representations Countries that do not host Canadian diplomatic missions Canada

Canada has an extensive diplomatic network maintained by Global Affairs Canada.There are 179 consulates and almost 112 embassies of Canada located around the world.

This listing does not include trade missions and honorary consulates.

== Overview ==
As a Commonwealth country, Canada's diplomatic missions in the capitals of other Commonwealth countries are referred to as High Commissions (as opposed to embassies). Canada has diplomatic and consular offices (including honorary consuls that are not included in this list) in over 270 locations in approximately 180 foreign countries.

Under the terms of the Canada–Australia Consular Services Sharing Agreement, the two countries provide consular services to each other's citizens at a number of locations around the world. At this time, there are 19 locations where Canadian offices provide consular services to Australians, and 12 other cities where Canadians can obtain consular services from Australian offices. In an emergency, Canadians can also seek assistance from British offices around the world if there is no resident Canadian office.

The province of Quebec has its own Ministry of International Relations (French: Ministère des Relations internationales) and a network of 33 offices in 18 countries "to promote and defend Québec's interests internationally while ensuring respect for its authority and the consistency of government activities." Other provinces, such as Alberta, British Columbia, and Ontario, also maintain offices abroad.

=== Recent developments ===
On March 5, 2012, Canadian Minister of Foreign Affairs John Baird announced that Canada was suspending its embassy in Syria, effective immediately, in response to the deteriorating security situation caused by the Syrian civil war. As a result, the Canadian Embassy in Amman, Jordan and Beirut, Lebanon now handles visa applications for Syrian citizens. Emergency consular assistance for Canadians living in Syria are done on behalf of the Embassy of Hungary in Damascus.

On September 7, 2012, Canada severed diplomatic ties with Iran and closed its embassy in Tehran, citing Iran's material support to the Assad regime during the Syrian civil war, non-compliance with United Nations resolutions regarding its nuclear program, continuing threats to Israel, and fears for the safety of Canadian diplomats following attacks on the British embassy in Iran in violation of the Vienna Convention. In addition, Canada formally listed the Iranian regime as a state sponsor of terrorism under the Justice for Victims of Terrorism Act. The Canadian Department of Foreign Affairs and International Trade advised all Canadians against travelling to Iran. Consular services would be assured by the Embassy of Canada in Ankara, Turkey and the department's Emergency Watch and Response Centre.

On June 2, 2019, Canada suspended embassy operations in Caracas, Venezuela effective immediately because its diplomats were no longer able to obtain visas from the Venezuelan government. Minister Chrystia Freeland said in a statement that "President Nicolás Maduro’s regime has taken steps to limit the ability of foreign embassies to function in Venezuela” and "that Canadian diplomats in Venezuela will no longer be in a position to obtain diplomatic accreditation under the Maduro regime." The Canadian Embassy in Bogotá, Colombia now handles consular assistance for Canadian citizens living in Venezuela.

== Current missions ==
=== Africa ===
Host country	Host city	Mission	Concurrent accreditation	Ref.
Algeria	Algiers	Embassy		
Benin	Cotonou	Embassy		
Burkina Faso	Ouagadougou	Embassy		
Cameroon	Yaoundé	High Commission	Countries: Central African Republic; Chad; Gabon	
Congo-Kinshasa	Kinshasa	Embassy	Countries: Congo-Brazzaville	
Egypt	Cairo	Embassy		
Ethiopia	Addis Ababa	Embassy	Countries: Djibouti; South Sudan; Sudan; International Organization: African Union	
Ghana	Accra	High Commission	Countries: Sierra Leone; Togo	
Ivory Coast	Abidjan	Embassy	Country: Liberia	
Kenya	Nairobi	High Commission	Countries: Eritrea; Somalia; Uganda; International Organizations: United Nations; United Nations Environment Programme; United Nations Human Settlements Programme	
Mali	Bamako	Embassy	Country: Niger	
Morocco	Rabat	Embassy	Country: Mauritania	
Mozambique	Maputo	High Commission	Countries: Angola; Eswatini	
Nigeria	Abuja	High Commission	Countries: Equatorial Guinea; São Tomé and Príncipe	
Nigeria	Lagos	Deputy High Commission	Countries: Equatorial Guinea; São Tomé and Príncipe	
Rwanda	Kigali	High Commission	Country: Burundi	
Senegal	Dakar	Embassy	Countries: Cape Verde; Gambia; Guinea; Guinea-Bissau	
South Africa	Pretoria	High Commission	Countries: Lesotho; Madagascar; Mauritius; Namibia	
Tanzania	Dar es Salaam	High Commission	Countries: Comoros; Seychelles	
Tunisia	Tunis	Embassy	Country: Libya	
Zambia	Lusaka	High Commission		
Zimbabwe	Harare	Embassy	Countries: Botswana; Malawi	

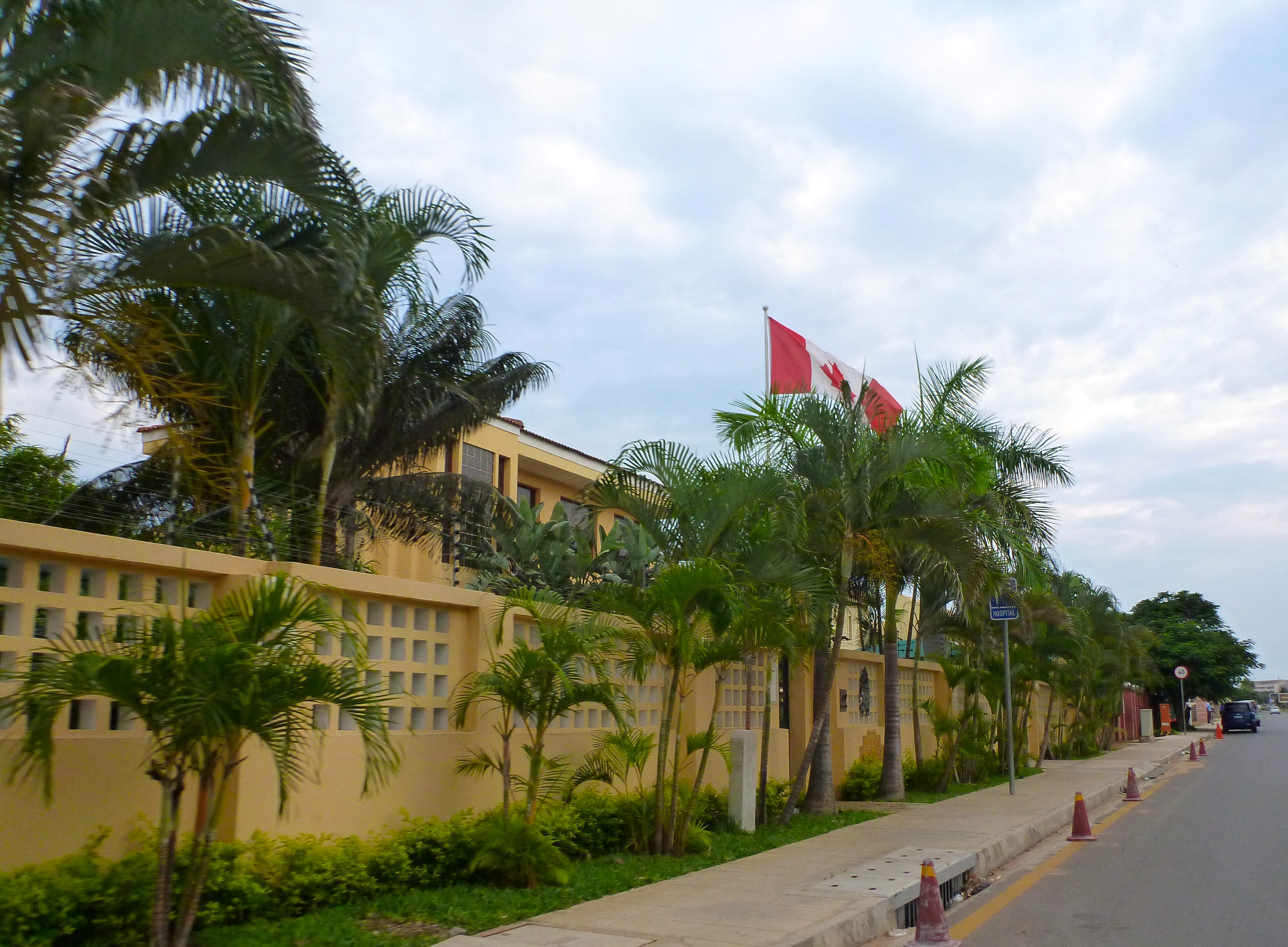
High Commission in Maputo

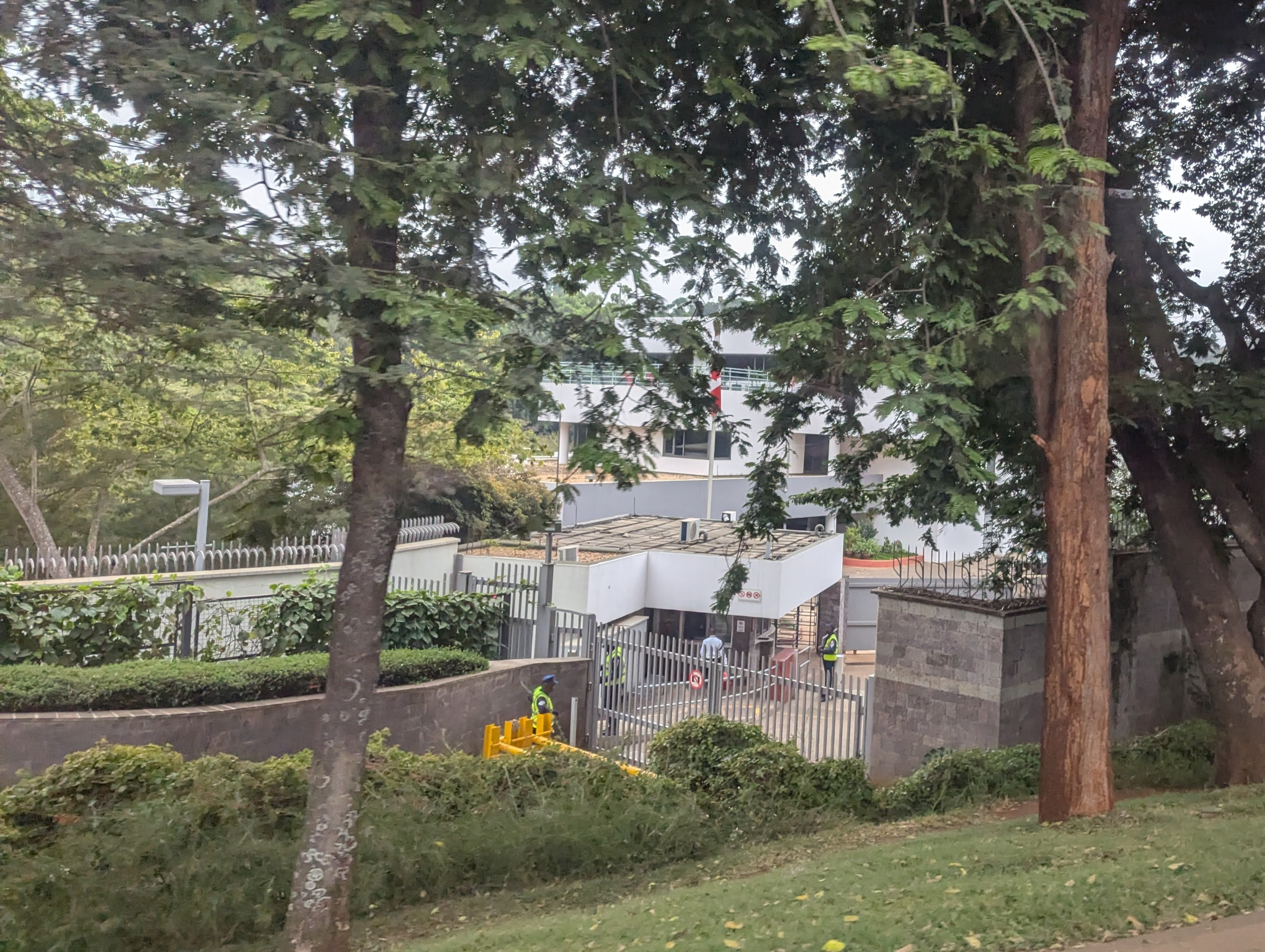
High Commission in Nairobi

=== Americas ===
Host country	Host city	Mission	Concurrent accreditation	Ref.
Argentina	Buenos Aires	Embassy	Country: Paraguay	
Barbados	Bridgetown	High Commission	Countries: Antigua and Barbuda; Dominica; Grenada; Saint Kitts and Nevis; Saint Lucia; Saint Vincent and the Grenadines	
Bolivia	La Paz	Embassy (Program Office)		
Brazil	Brasília	Embassy		
Brazil	Rio de Janeiro	Consulate-General		
Brazil	São Paulo	Consulate-General		
Chile	Santiago de Chile	Embassy		
Colombia	Bogotá	Embassy	Countries: Venezuela	
Costa Rica	San José	Embassy	Countries: Honduras; Nicaragua	
Cuba	Havana	Embassy		
Dominican Republic	Santo Domingo	Embassy		
Dominican Republic	Punta Cana	Embassy Office		
Ecuador	Quito	Embassy		
El Salvador	San Salvador	Embassy		
Guatemala	Guatemala City	Embassy	Country: Belize	
Guyana	Georgetown	High Commission	Country: Suriname	
Haiti	Port-au-Prince	Embassy		
Honduras	Tegucigalpa	Embassy Office		
Jamaica	Kingston	High Commission	Countries: Bahamas; Cayman Islands; Turks and Caicos Islands	
Mexico	Mexico City	Embassy		
Mexico	Monterrey	Consulate-General		
Mexico	Guadalajara	Consulate		
Mexico	Acapulco	Consular Agency		
Mexico	Cabo San Lucas	Consular Agency		
Mexico	Cancún	Consular Agency		
Mexico	Mazatlán	Consular Agency		
Mexico	Playa del Carmen	Consular Agency		
Mexico	Puerto Vallarta	Consular Agency		
Nicaragua	Managua	Embassy Office		
Panama	Panama City	Embassy		
Peru	Lima	Embassy		
Trinidad and Tobago	Port of Spain	High Commission		
United States	Washington, D.C.	Embassy		
United States	Atlanta	Consulate-General		
United States	Boston	Consulate-General		
United States	Chicago	Consulate-General		
United States	Dallas	Consulate-General		
United States	Denver	Consulate-General		
United States	Detroit	Consulate-General		
United States	Los Angeles	Consulate General		
United States	Miami	Consulate-General		
United States	Minneapolis	Consulate-General		
United States	New York City	Consulate-General		
United States	San Francisco	Consulate-General		
United States	Seattle	Consulate-General		
Uruguay	Montevideo	Embassy		

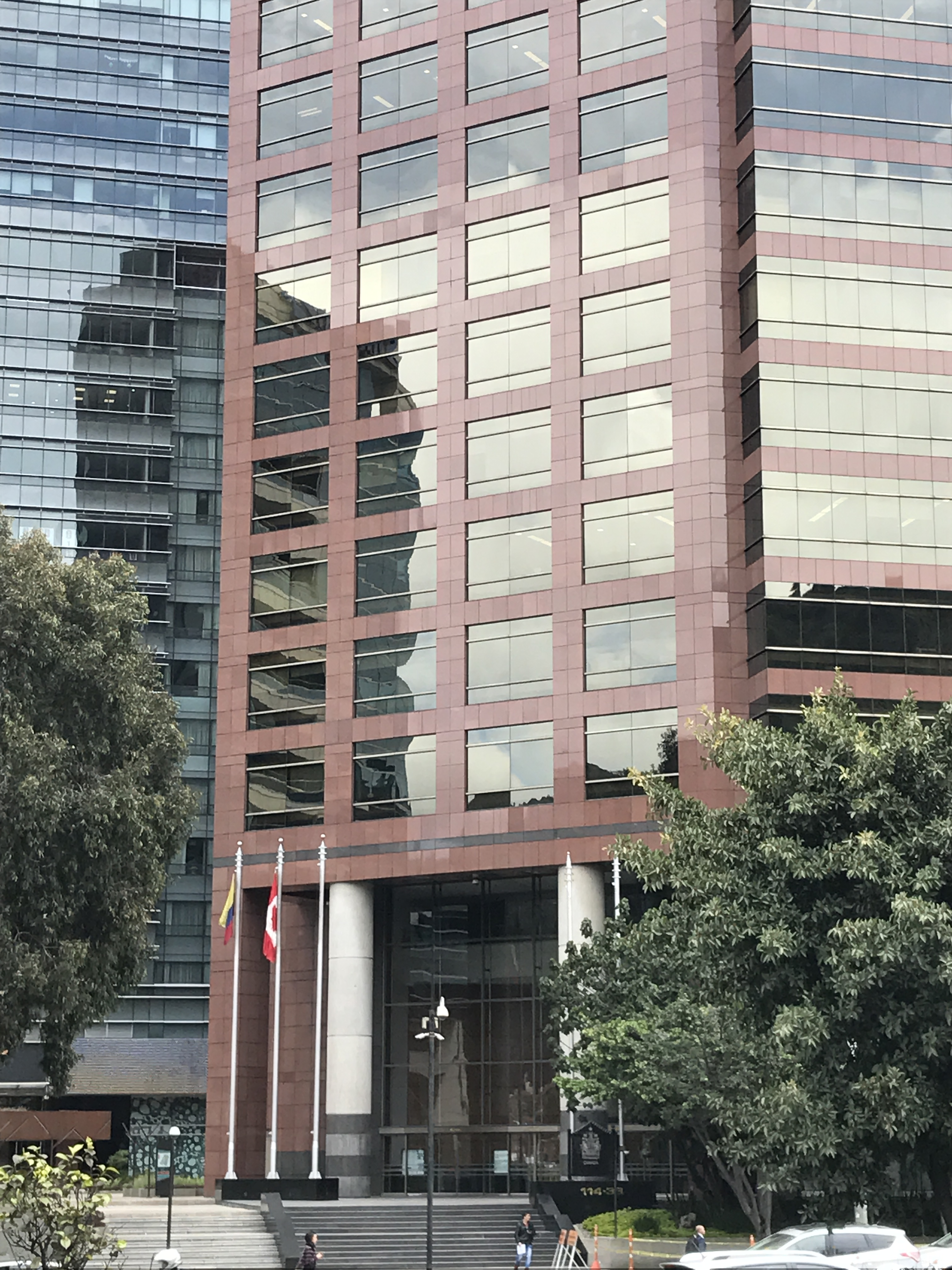
Building hosting the Embassy in Bogotá

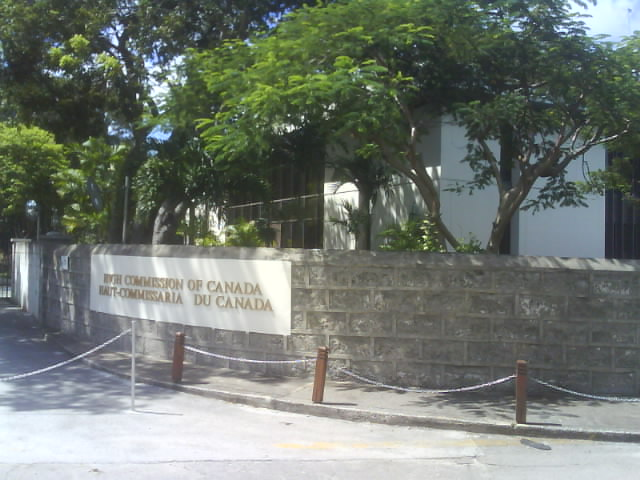
High Commission in Bridgetown

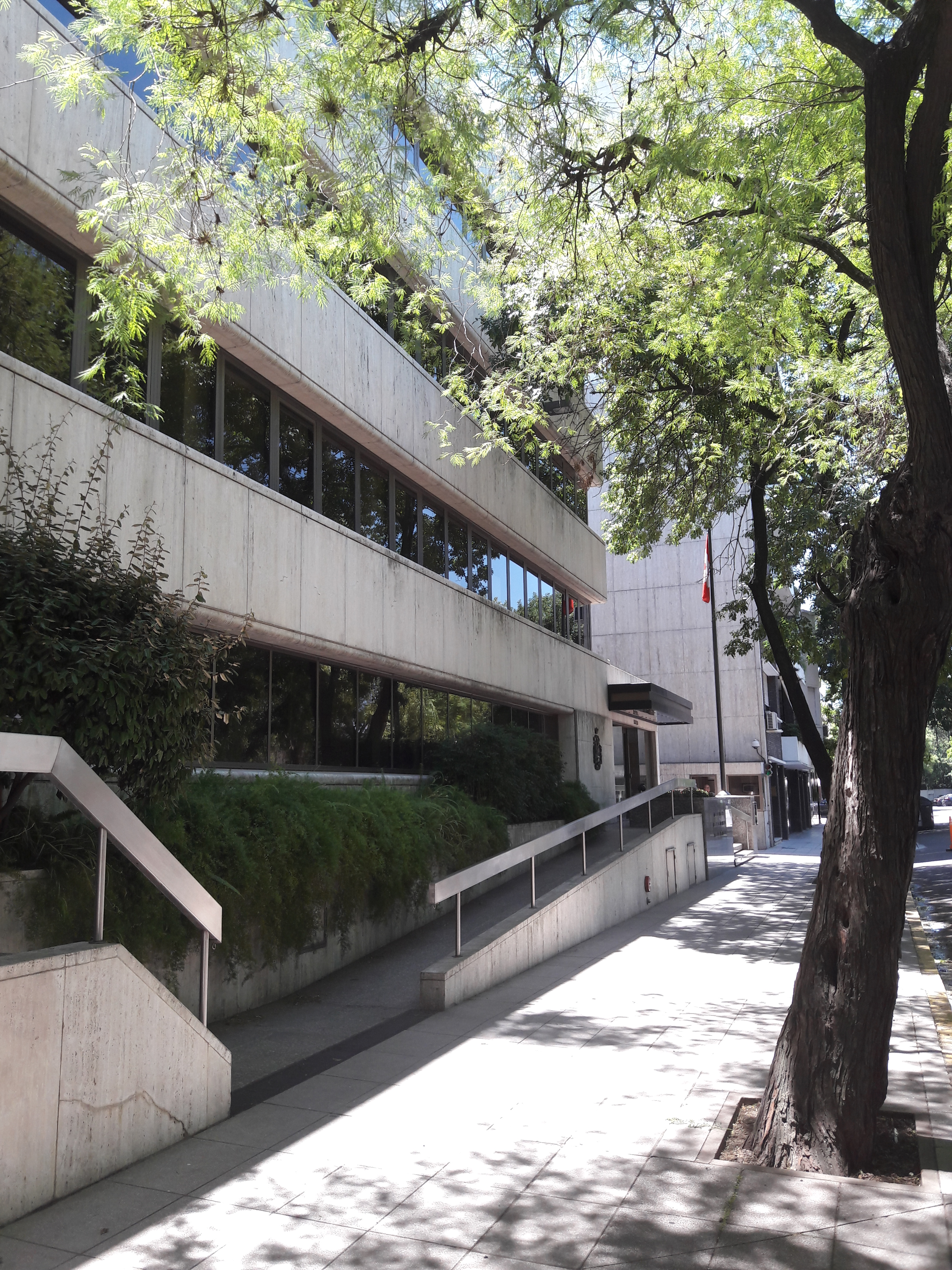
Embassy in Buenos Aires

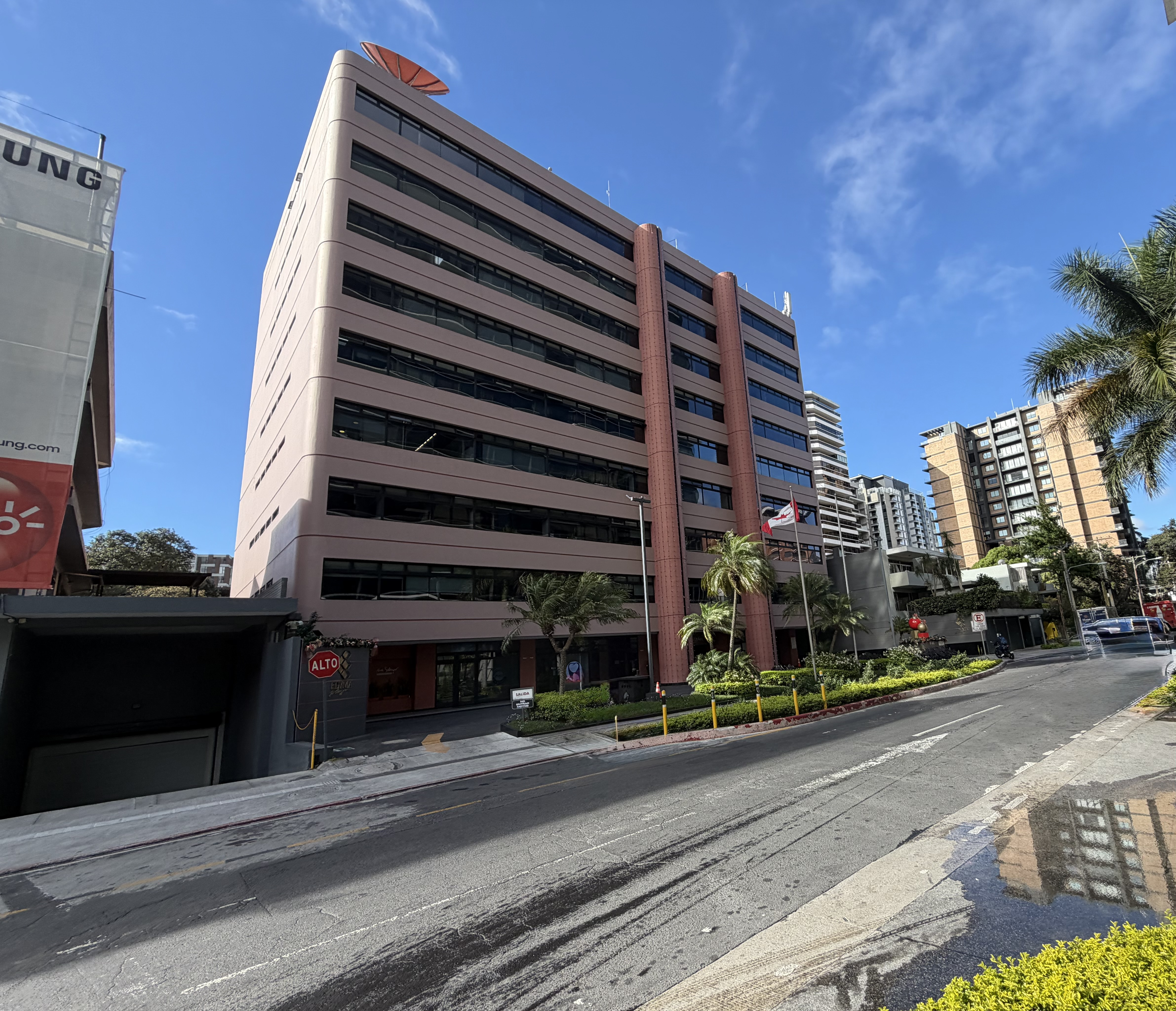
Building hosting the Embassy in Guatemala City

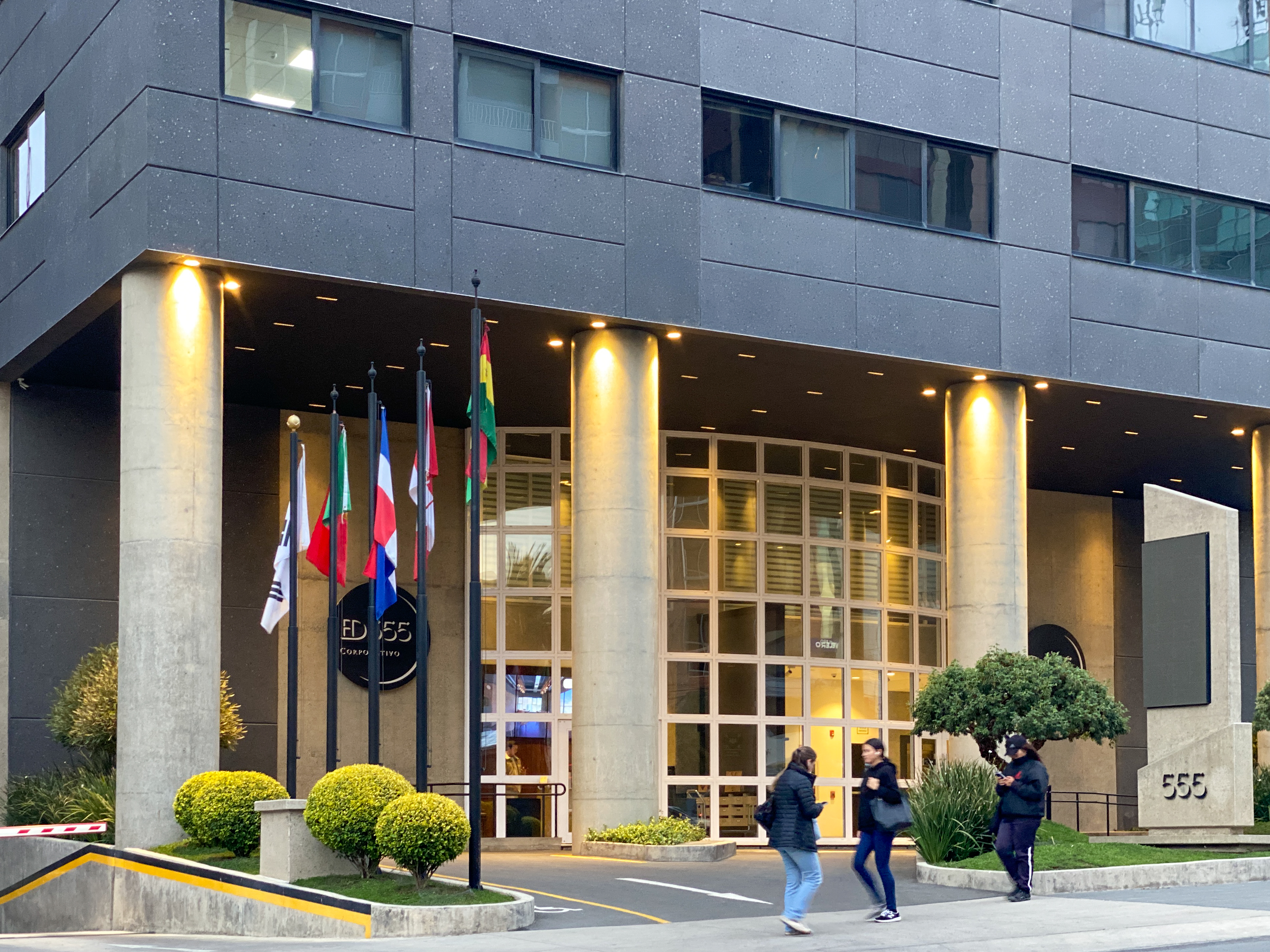
Building hosting the Embassy in La Paz

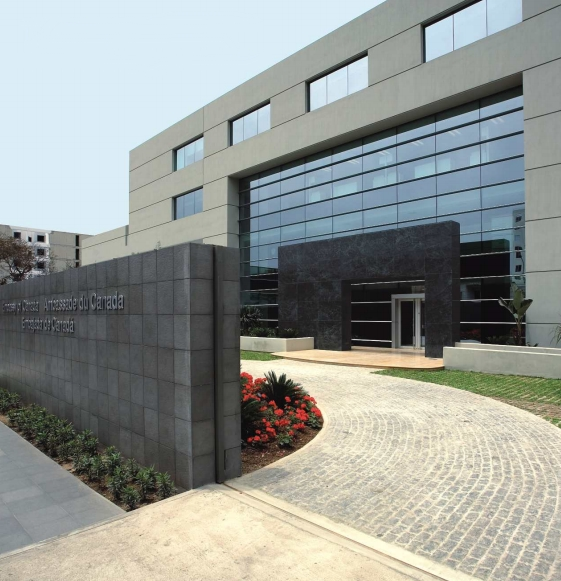
Embassy in Lima

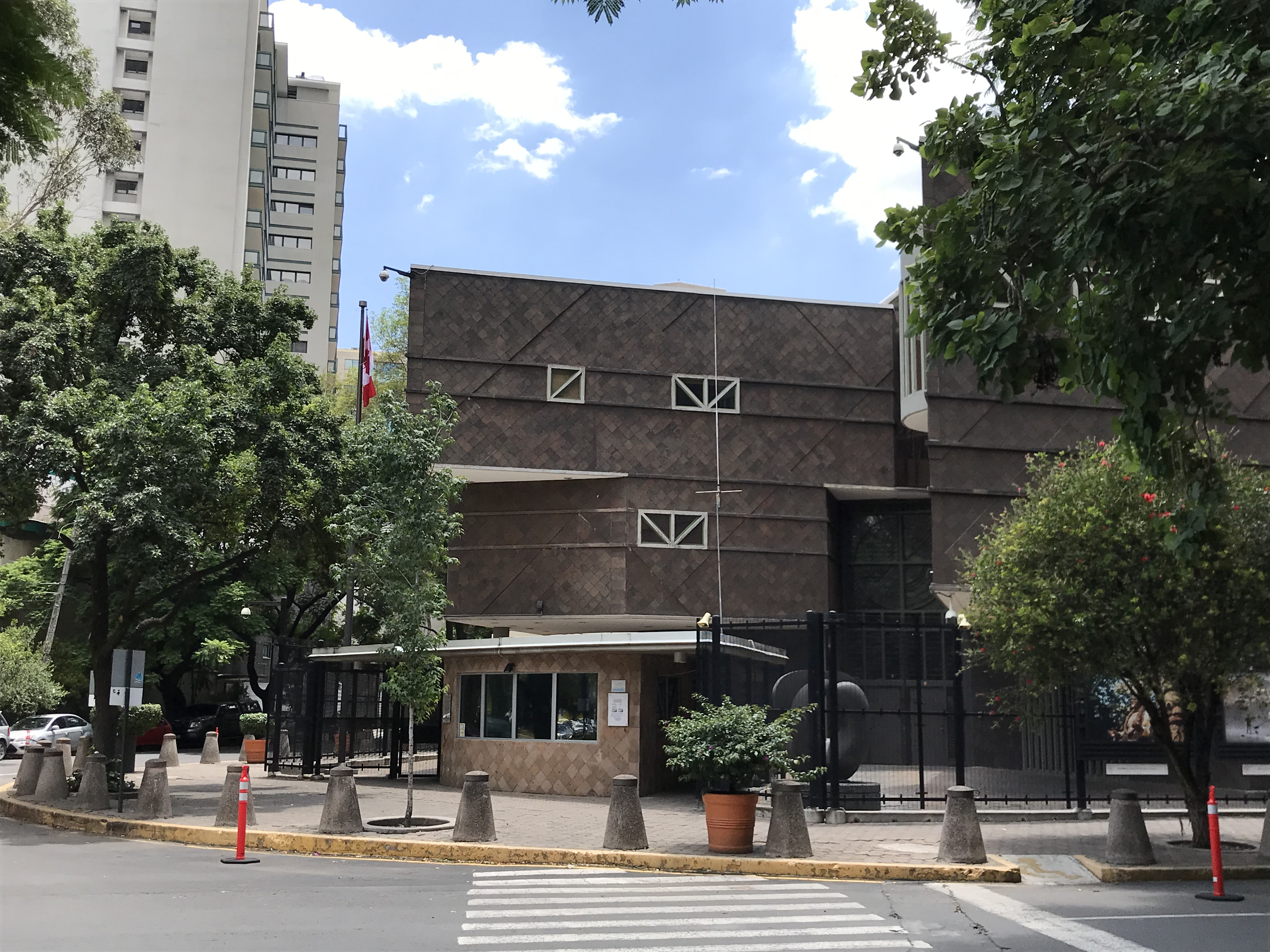
Embassy in Mexico City

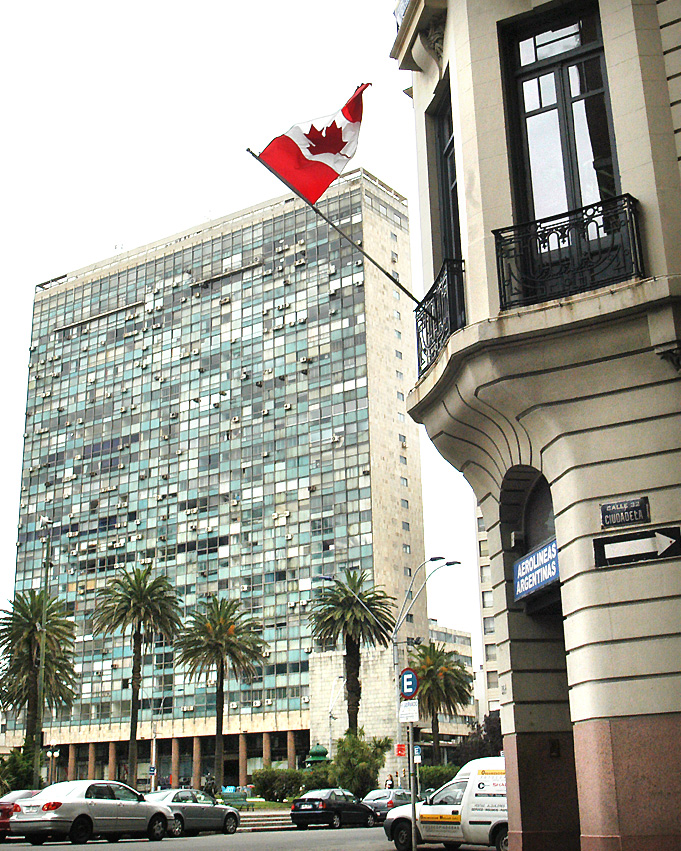
Embassy in Montevideo

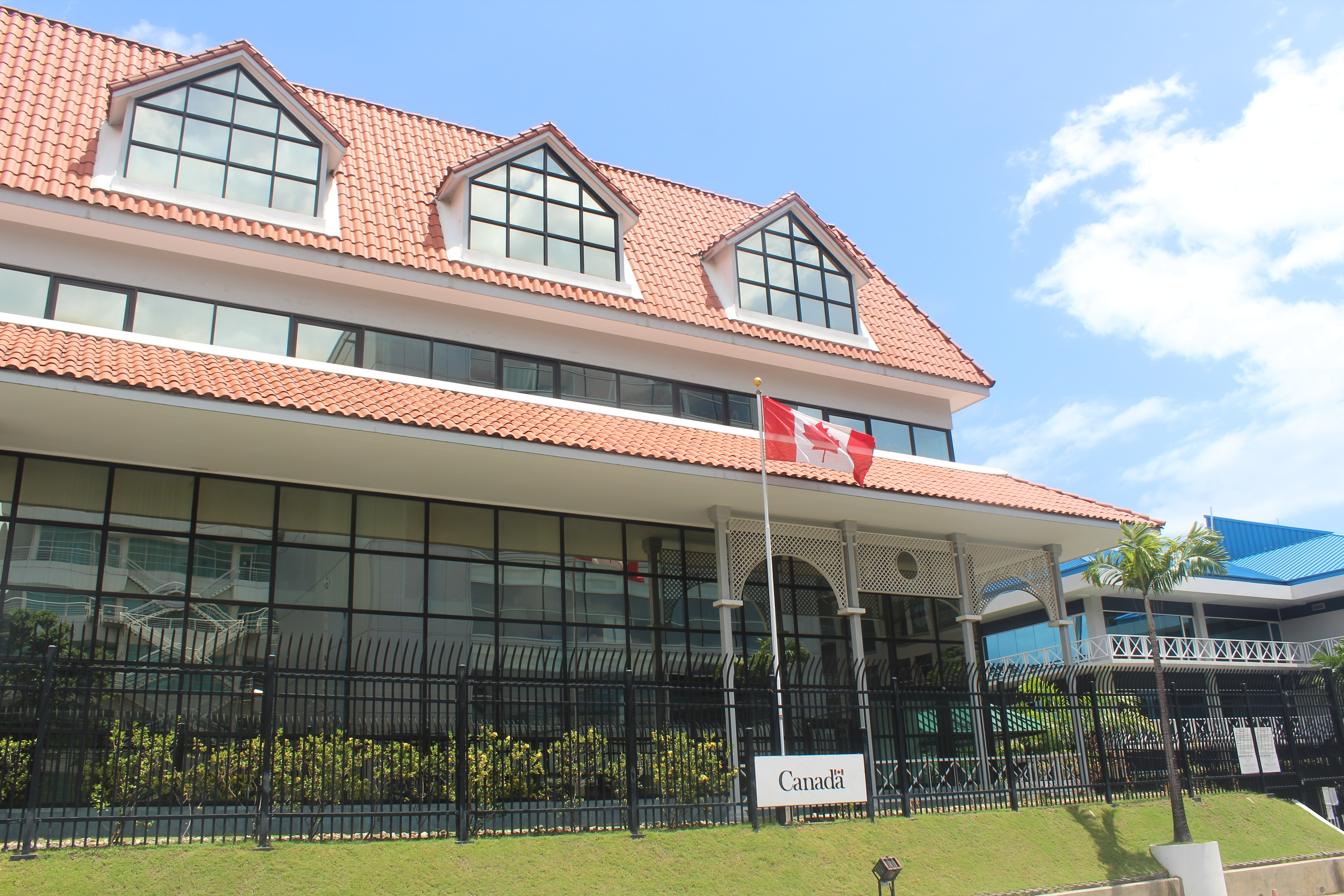
High Commission in Port of Spain

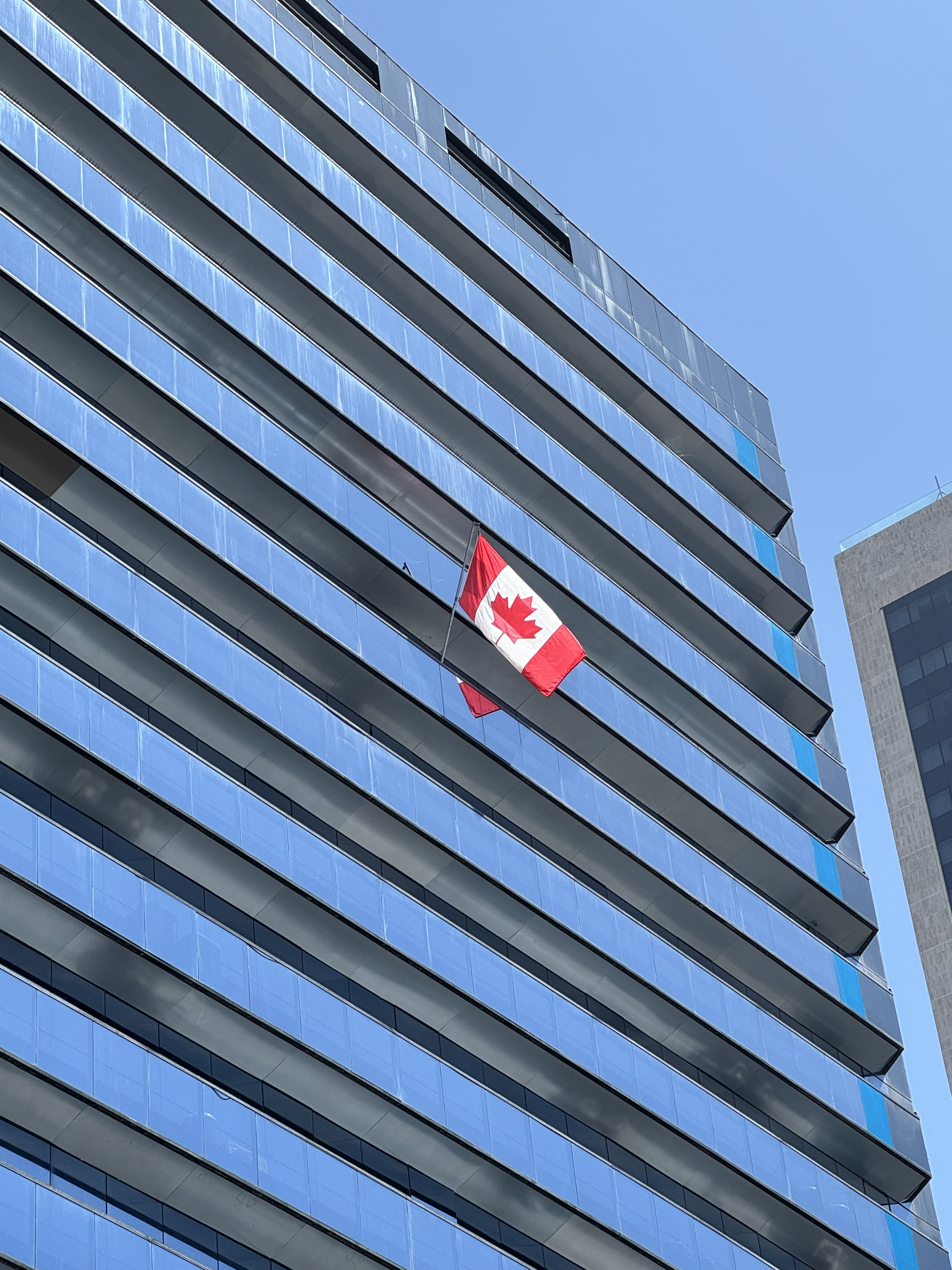
Consulate-General in Rio de Janeiro

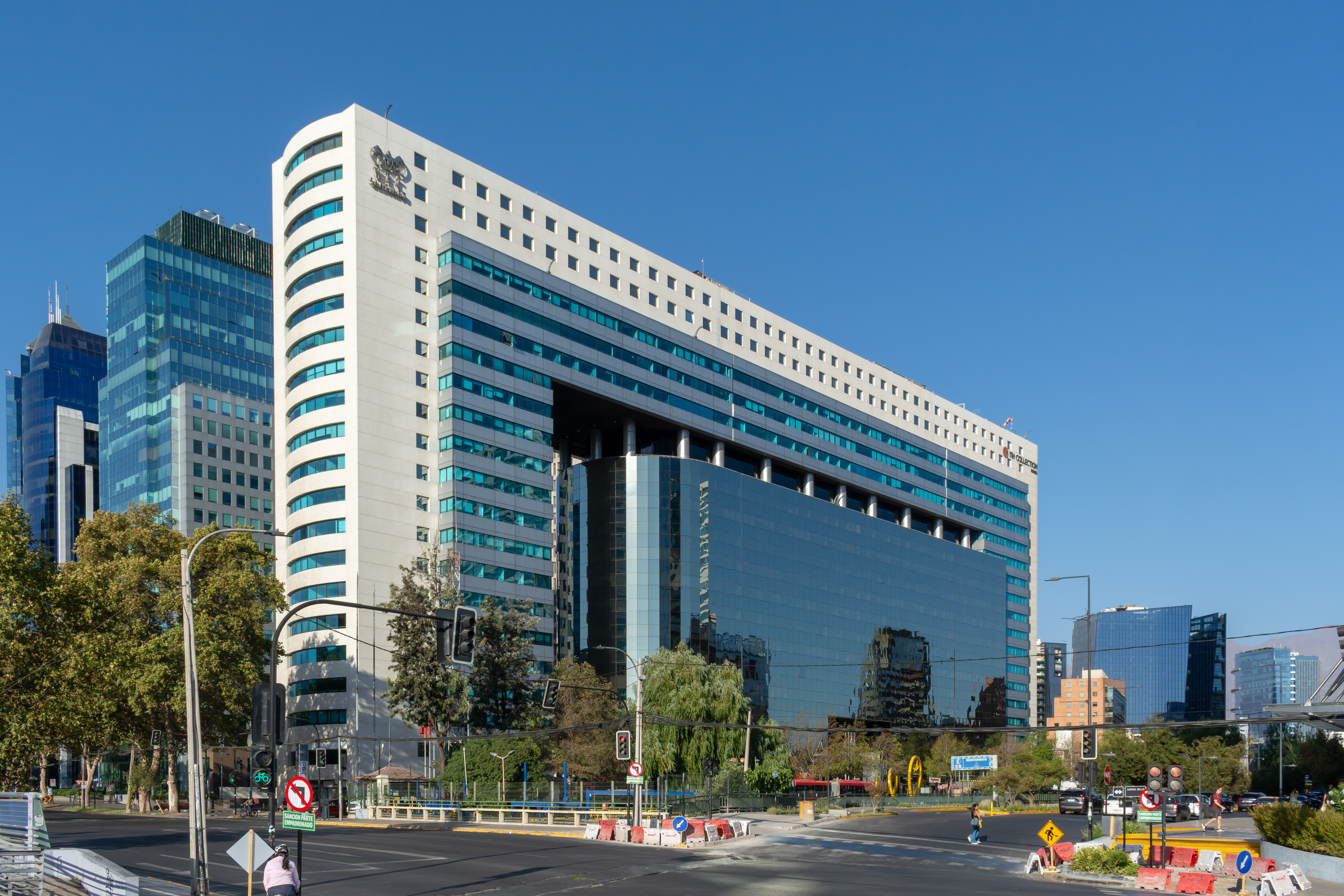
Building hosting the Embassy in Santiago

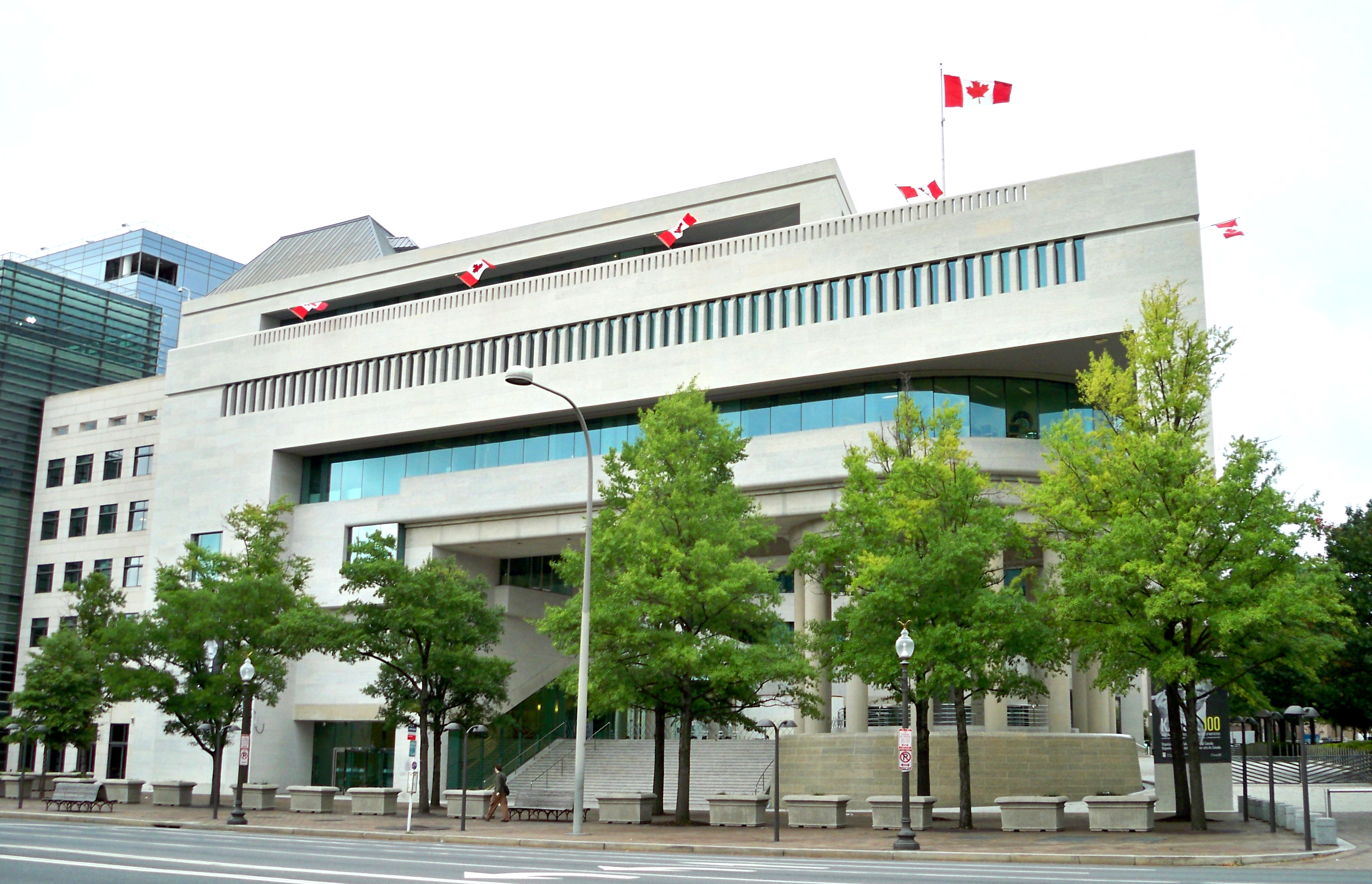
Embassy in Washington, D.C.

=== Asia ===
Host country	Host city	Mission	Concurrent accreditation	Ref.
Armenia	Yerevan	Embassy		
Bangladesh	Dhaka	High Commission		
Brunei	Bandar Seri Begawan	High Commission		
Cambodia	Phnom Penh	Embassy		
China	Beijing	Embassy		
China	Chongqing	Consulate-General		
China	Guangzhou	Consulate-General		
China	Hong Kong	Consulate-General		
China	Shanghai	Consulate-General		
India	New Delhi	High Commission	Countries: Bhutan; Nepal	
India	Bengaluru	Consulate-General	Countries: Bhutan; Nepal	
India	Chandigarh	Consulate-General	Countries: Bhutan; Nepal	
India	Mumbai	Consulate-General	Countries: Bhutan; Nepal	
Indonesia	Jakarta	Embassy	Country: Timor-Leste; International Organization: Association of Southeast Asian Nations	
Iraq	Baghdad	Embassy		
Israel	Tel Aviv	Embassy		
Japan	Tokyo	Embassy		
Jordan	Amman	Embassy		
Kazakhstan	Astana	Embassy	Countries: Kyrgyzstan; Tajikistan; Turkmenistan; Uzbekistan	
Kuwait	Kuwait City	Embassy		
Laos	Vientiane	Embassy		
Lebanon	Beirut	Embassy	Country: Syria	
Malaysia	Kuala Lumpur	High Commission		
Mongolia	Ulaanbaatar	Embassy		
Myanmar	Yangon	Embassy		
Pakistan	Islamabad	High Commission	Country: Afghanistan	
Pakistan	Lahore	Consulate	Country: Afghanistan	
Palestine	Ramallah	Representative Office		
Philippines	Manila	Embassy	Country: Palau	
Qatar	Doha	Embassy		
Saudi Arabia	Riyadh	Embassy	Countries: Bahrain; Oman; Yemen	
Singapore	Singapore	High Commission		
South Korea	Seoul	Embassy	Country: North Korea	
Sri Lanka	Colombo	High Commission	Country: Maldives	
Republic of China (Taiwan)	Taipei	Trade Office		
Thailand	Bangkok	Embassy		
Turkey	Ankara	Embassy	Countries: Azerbaijan; Georgia; Iran	
Turkey	Istanbul	Consulate-General	Countries: Azerbaijan; Georgia; Iran	
United Arab Emirates	Abu Dhabi	Embassy		
United Arab Emirates	Dubai	Consulate-General		
Vietnam	Hanoi	Embassy		
Vietnam	Ho Chi Minh City	Consulate-General		

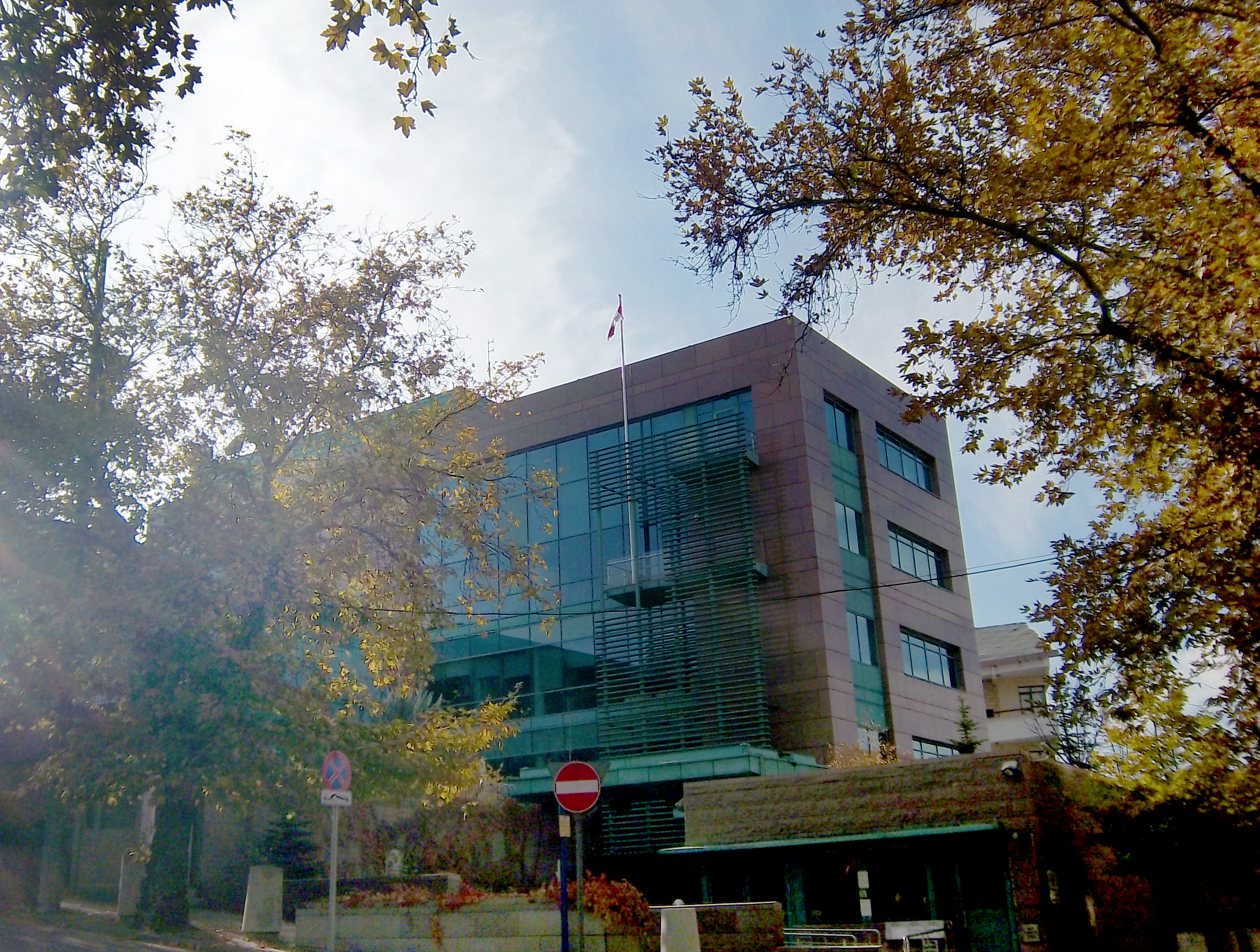
Embassy in Ankara

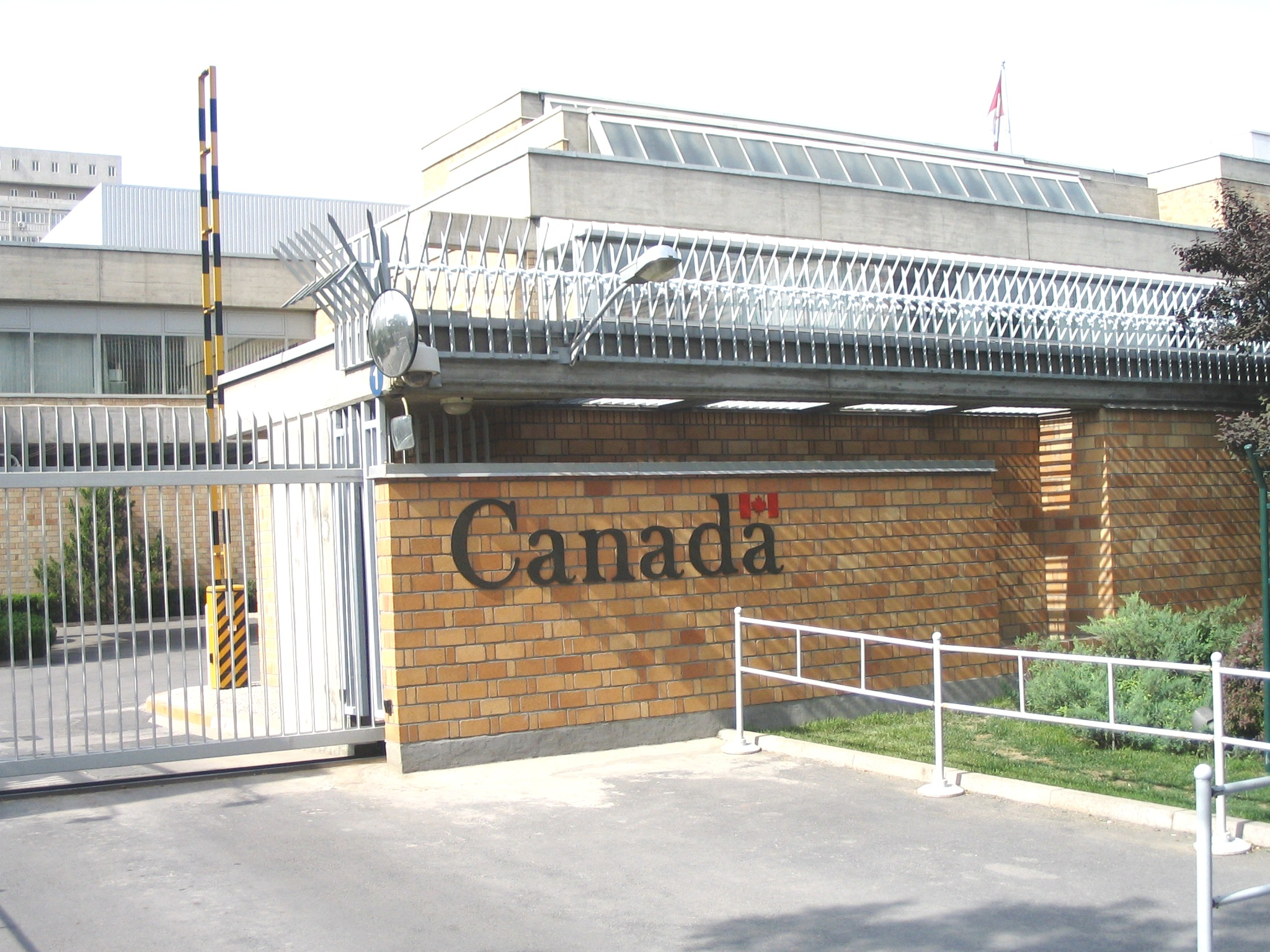
Embassy in Beijing

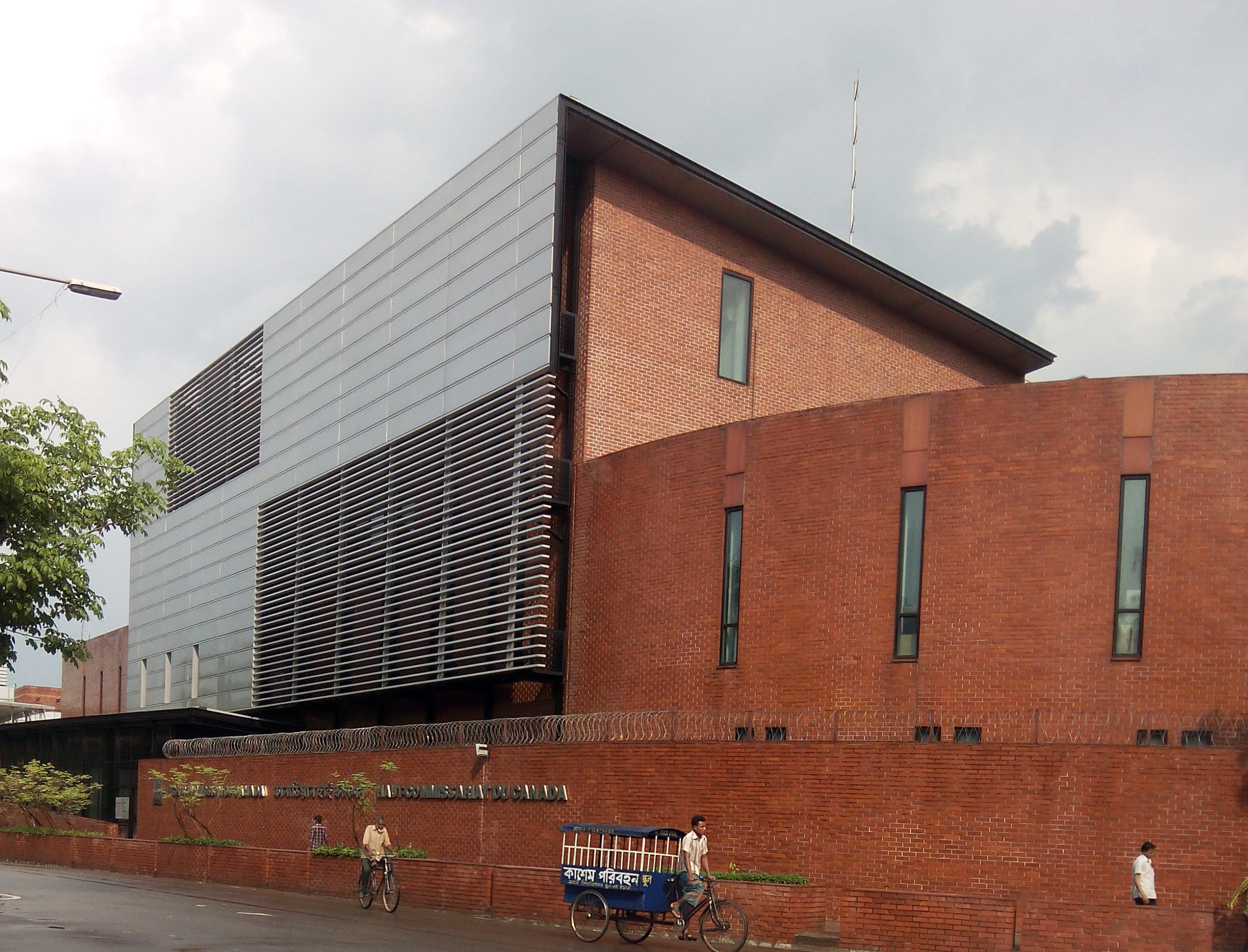
High Commission in Dhaka

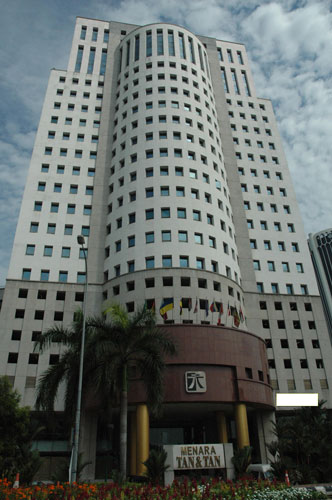
Building hosting the High Commission in Kuala Lumpur

Building hosting the Embassy in Manila

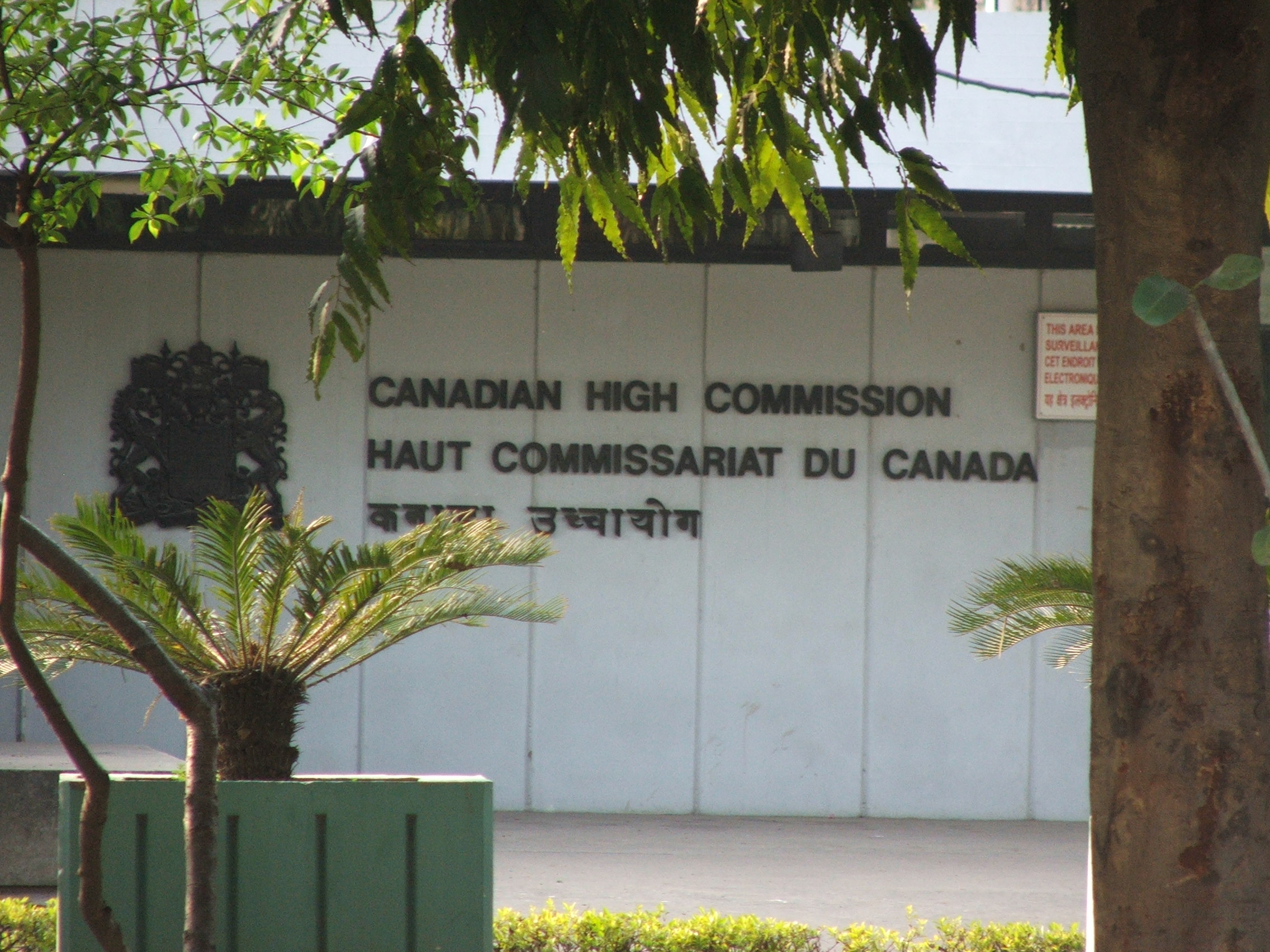
High Commission in New Delhi

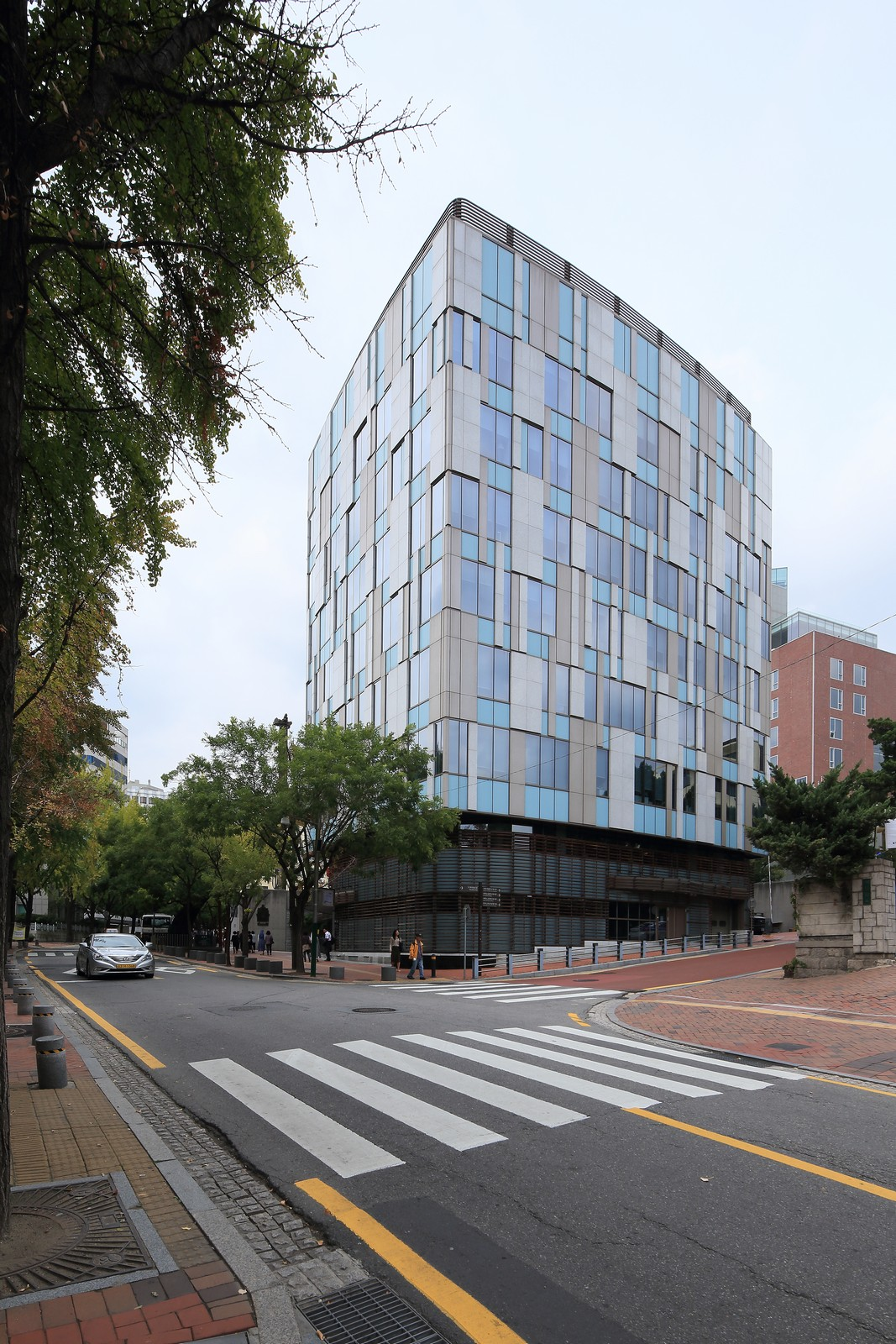
Embassy in Seoul

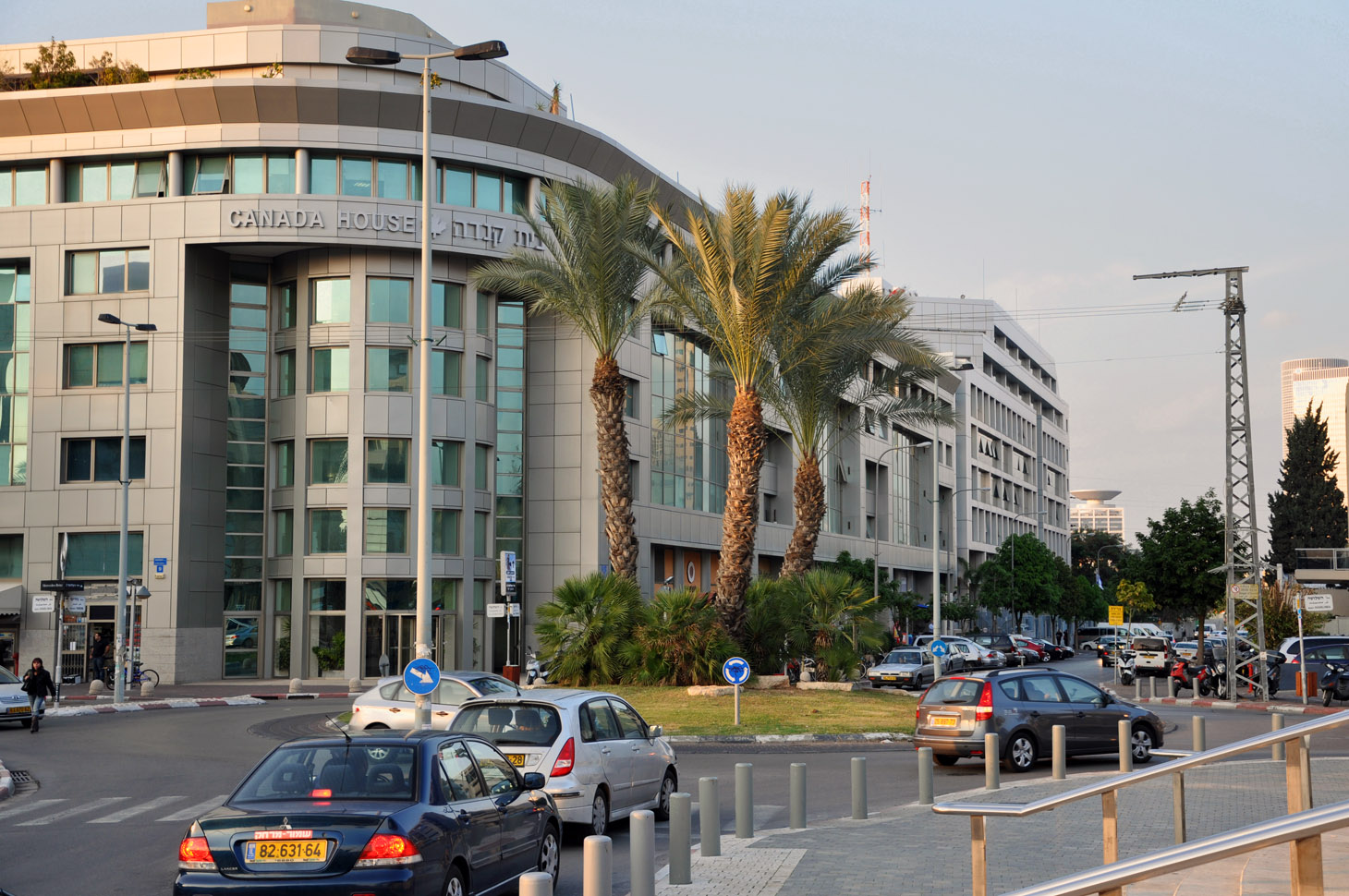
Building hosting the Embassy in Tel Aviv

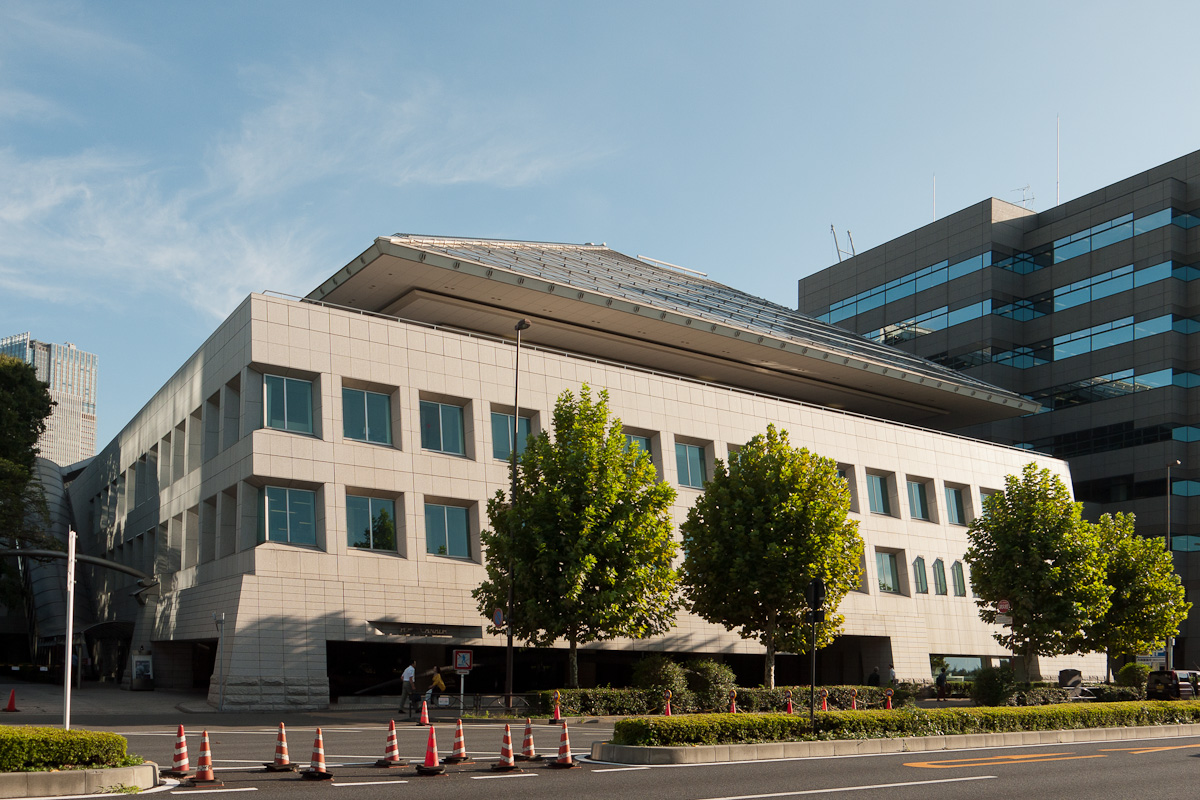
Embassy in Tokyo

=== Europe ===
Host country	Host city	Mission	Concurrent accreditation	Ref.
Austria	Vienna	Embassy	International Organizations: International Atomic Energy Agency; Comprehensive Nuclear-Test-Ban Treaty Organization; United Nations	
Belgium	Brussels	Embassy	Country: Luxembourg; International Organizations: Council of Europe (Note: Accredited as an observer mission); European Union	
Croatia	Zagreb	Embassy	Country: Kosovo	
Czech Republic	Prague	Embassy		
Denmark	Copenhagen	Embassy		
Denmark	Nuuk	Consulate		
Estonia	Tallinn	Embassy		
Finland	Helsinki	Embassy		
France	Paris	Embassy	Country: Monaco; International Organization: Organisation internationale de la Francophonie	
Germany	Berlin	Embassy		
Germany	Düsseldorf	Consulate		
Germany	Munich	Consulate		
Greece	Athens	Embassy	Country: Cyprus	
Holy See (Note: The Canadian Embassy to the Holy See is located outside Vatican territory in Rome.)	Rome	Embassy		
Hungary	Budapest	Embassy	Countries: Bosnia and Herzegovina; Slovenia	
Iceland	Reykjavík	Embassy		
Ireland	Dublin	Embassy		
Italy	Rome	Embassy	Countries: Albania; Malta; San Marino; International Organizations: Committee on World Food Security; Food and Agriculture Organization; International Fund for Agricultural Development; World Food Programme	
Italy	Milan	Consulate	Countries: Albania; Malta; San Marino; International Organizations: Committee on World Food Security; Food and Agriculture Organization; International Fund for Agricultural Development; World Food Programme	
Latvia	Riga	Embassy		
Lithuania	Vilnius	Embassy		
Netherlands	The Hague	Embassy	International Organizations: Organisation for the Prohibition of Chemical Weapons	
Norway	Oslo	Embassy		
Poland	Warsaw	Embassy	Country: Belarus	
Portugal	Lisbon	Embassy		
Romania	Bucharest	Embassy	Countries: Bulgaria; Moldova	
Russia	Moscow	Embassy		
Serbia	Belgrade	Embassy	Countries: Montenegro; North Macedonia	
Slovakia	Bratislava	Embassy		
Spain	Madrid	Embassy	Country: Andorra	
Spain	Barcelona	Consulate	Country: Andorra	
Sweden	Stockholm	Embassy		
Switzerland	Bern	Embassy	Country: Liechtenstein	
Ukraine	Kyiv	Embassy		
United Kingdom	London	High Commission	International Organizations: Commonwealth of Nations; International Maritime Organization	

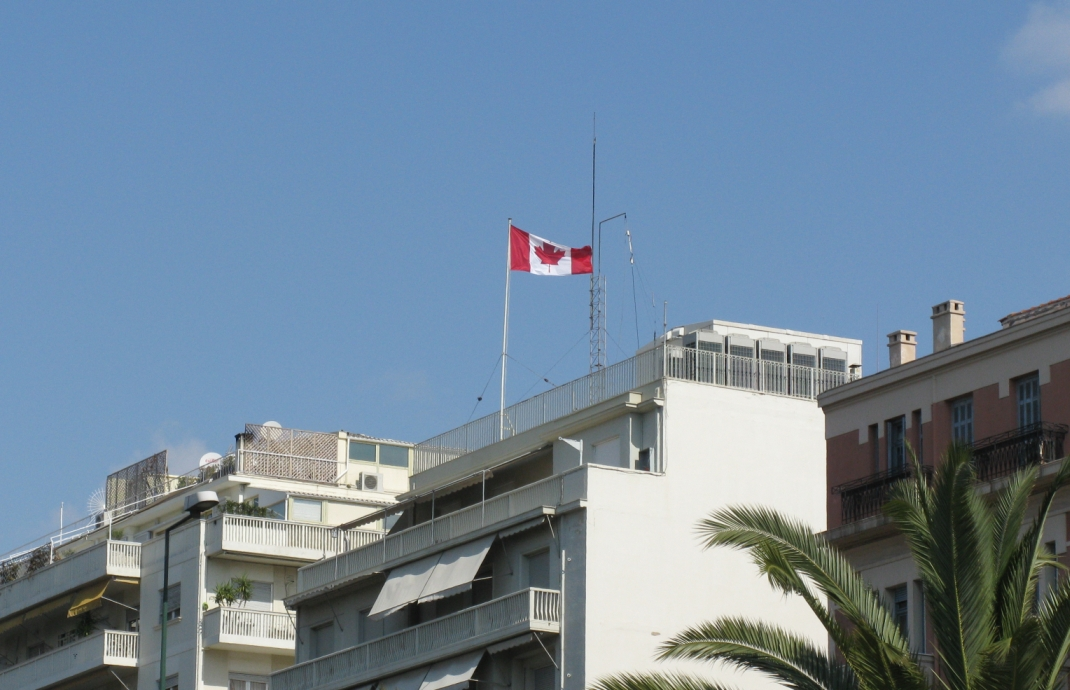
Embassy in Athens

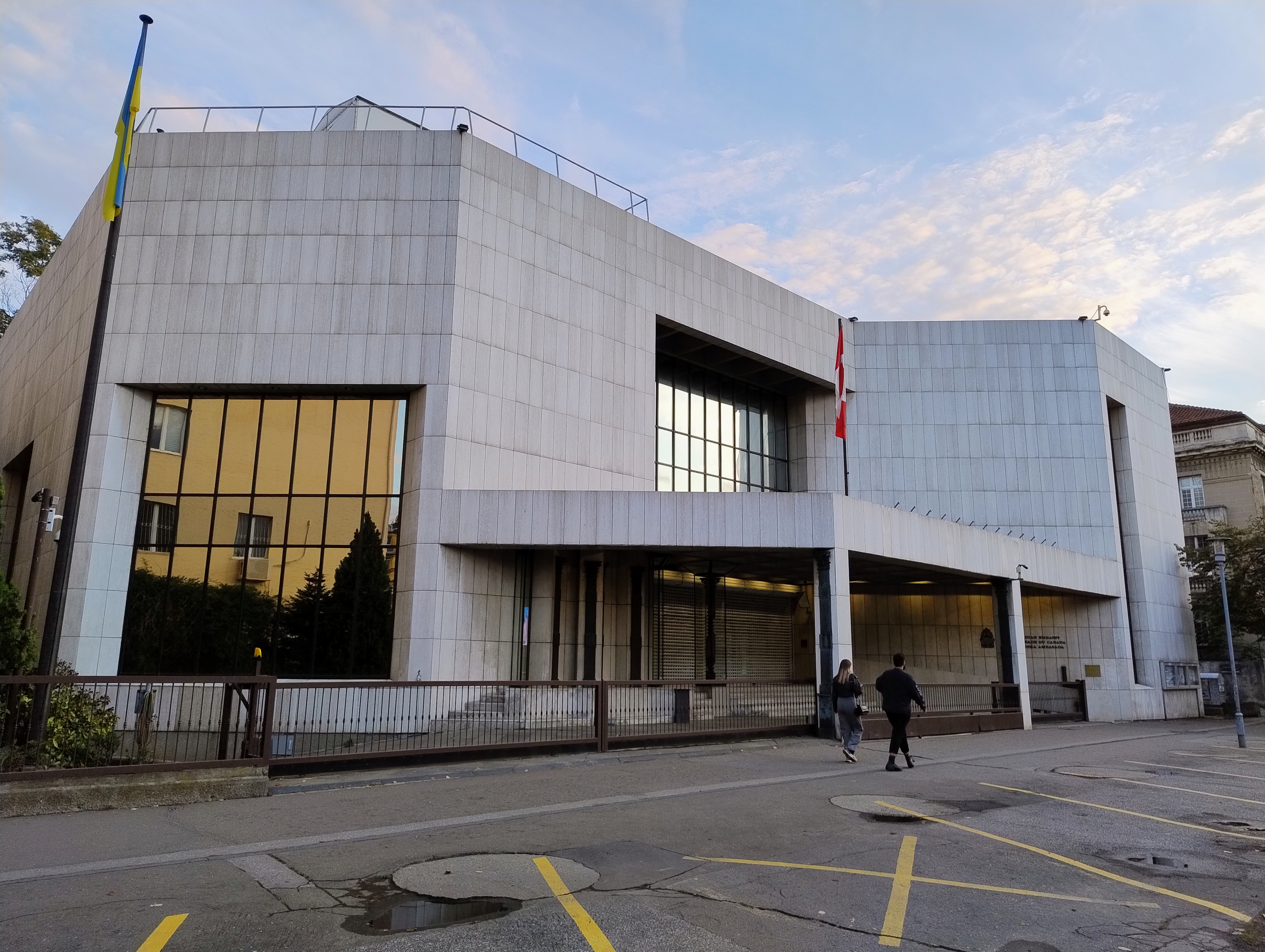
Embassy in Belgrade

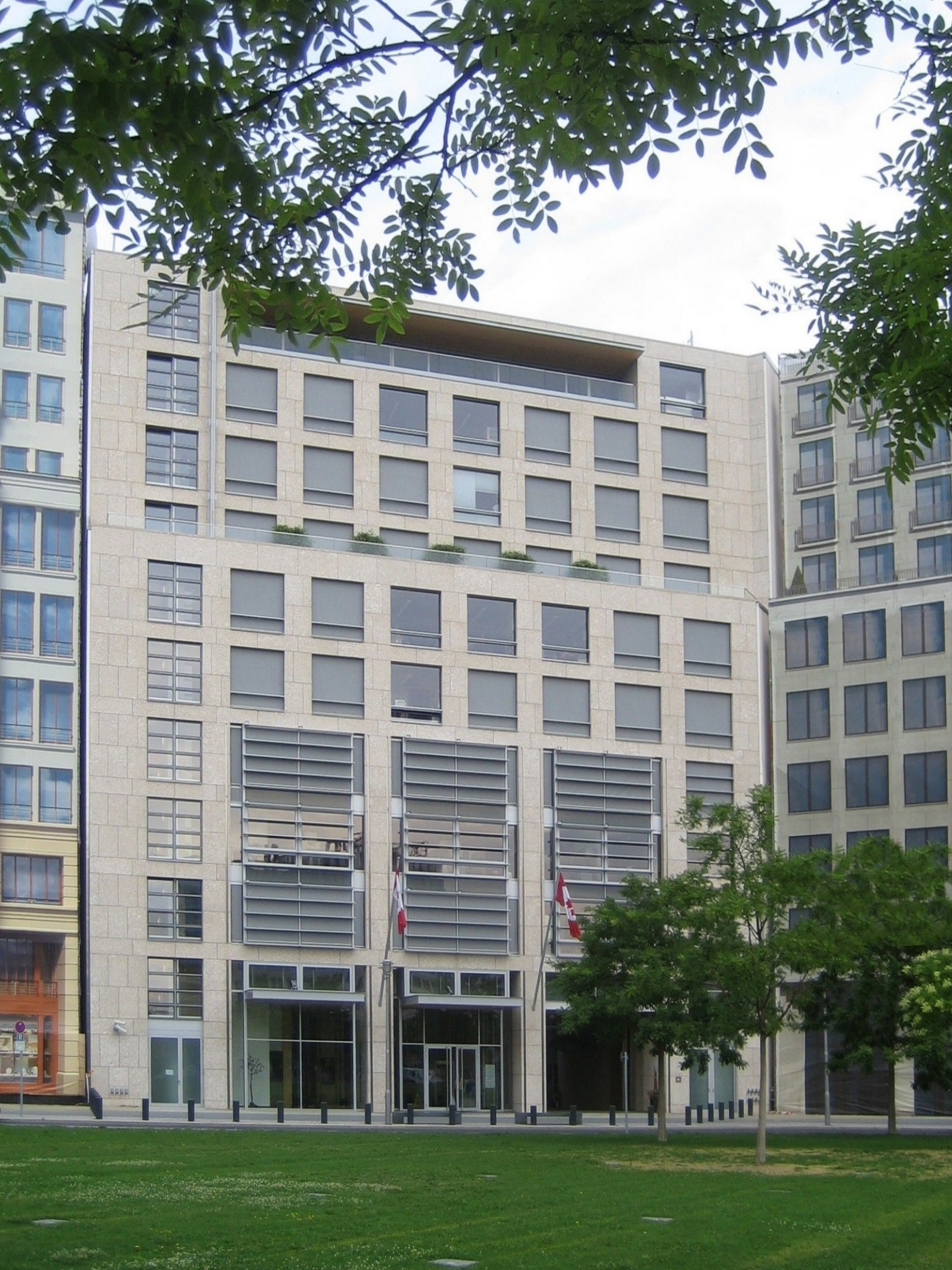
Embassy in Berlin

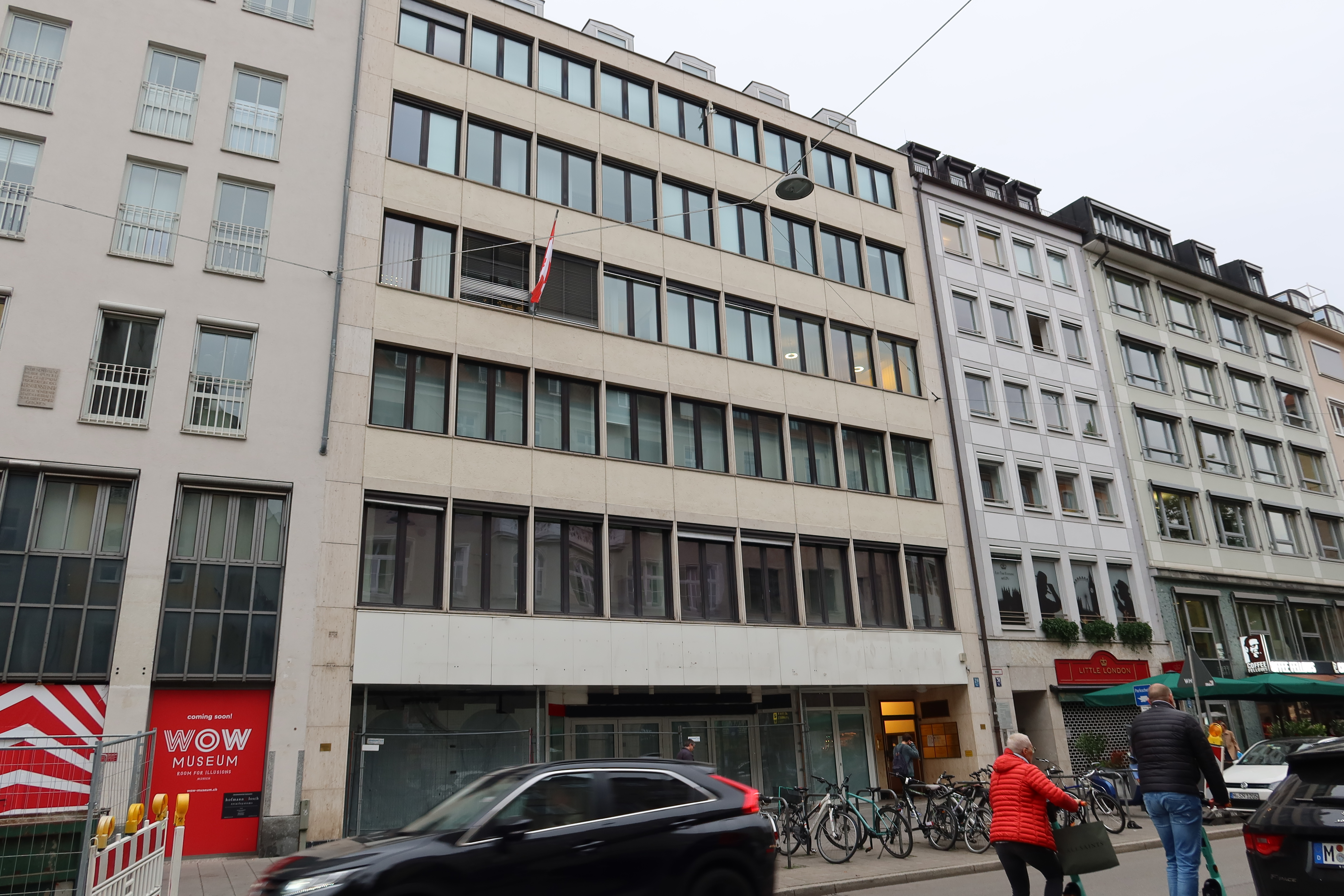
Consulate in Munich

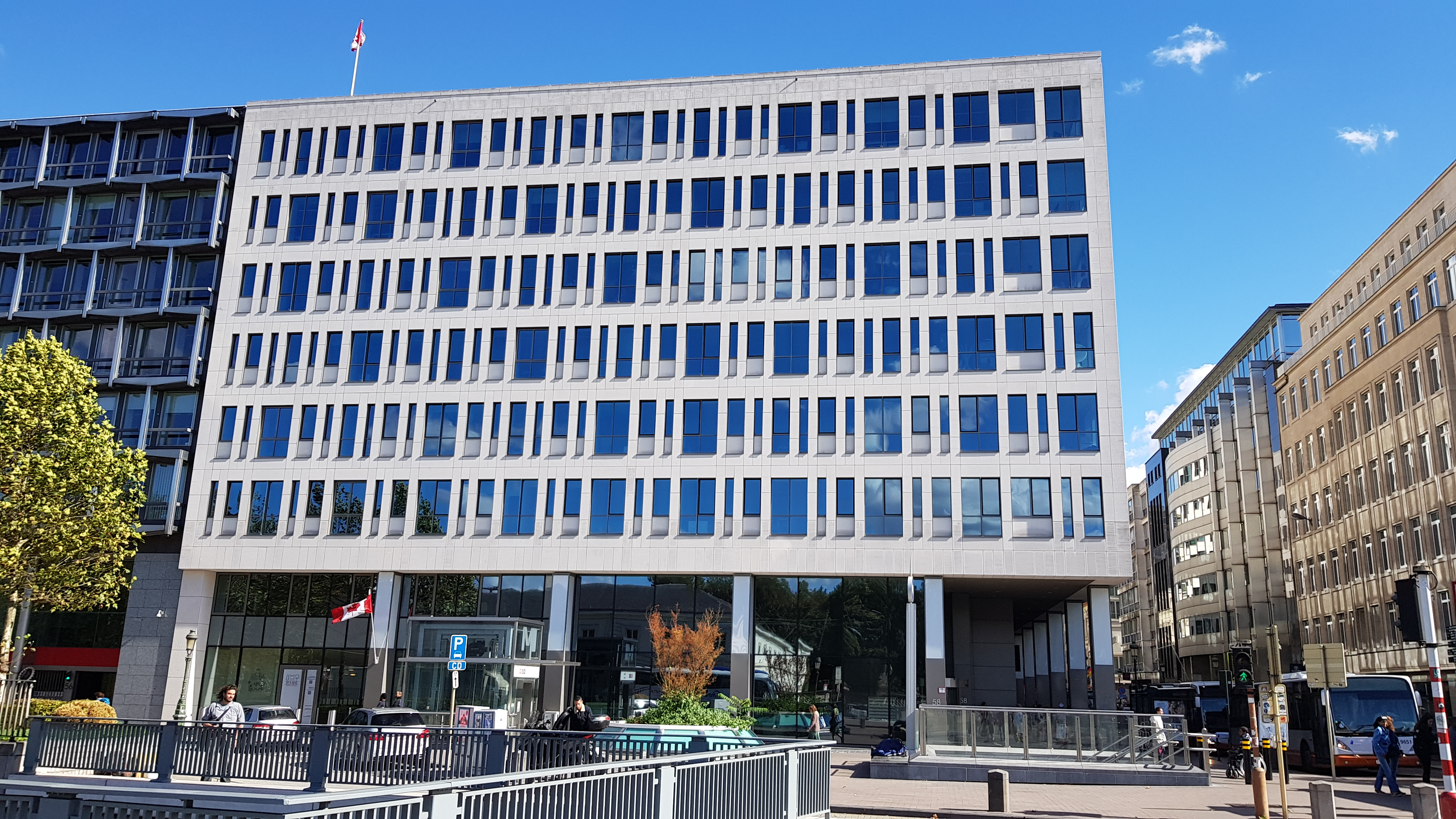
Embassy in Brussels

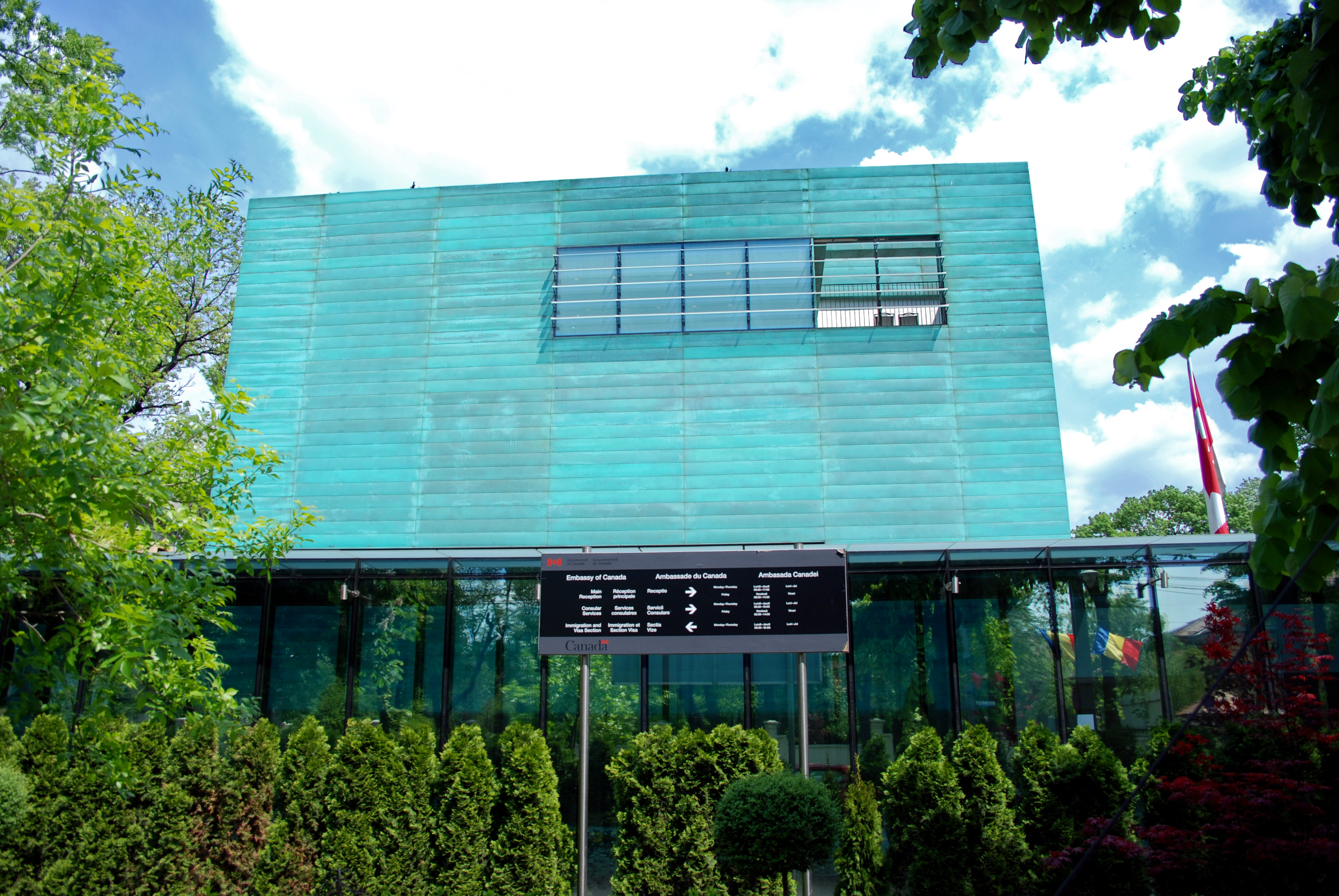
Embassy in Bucharest

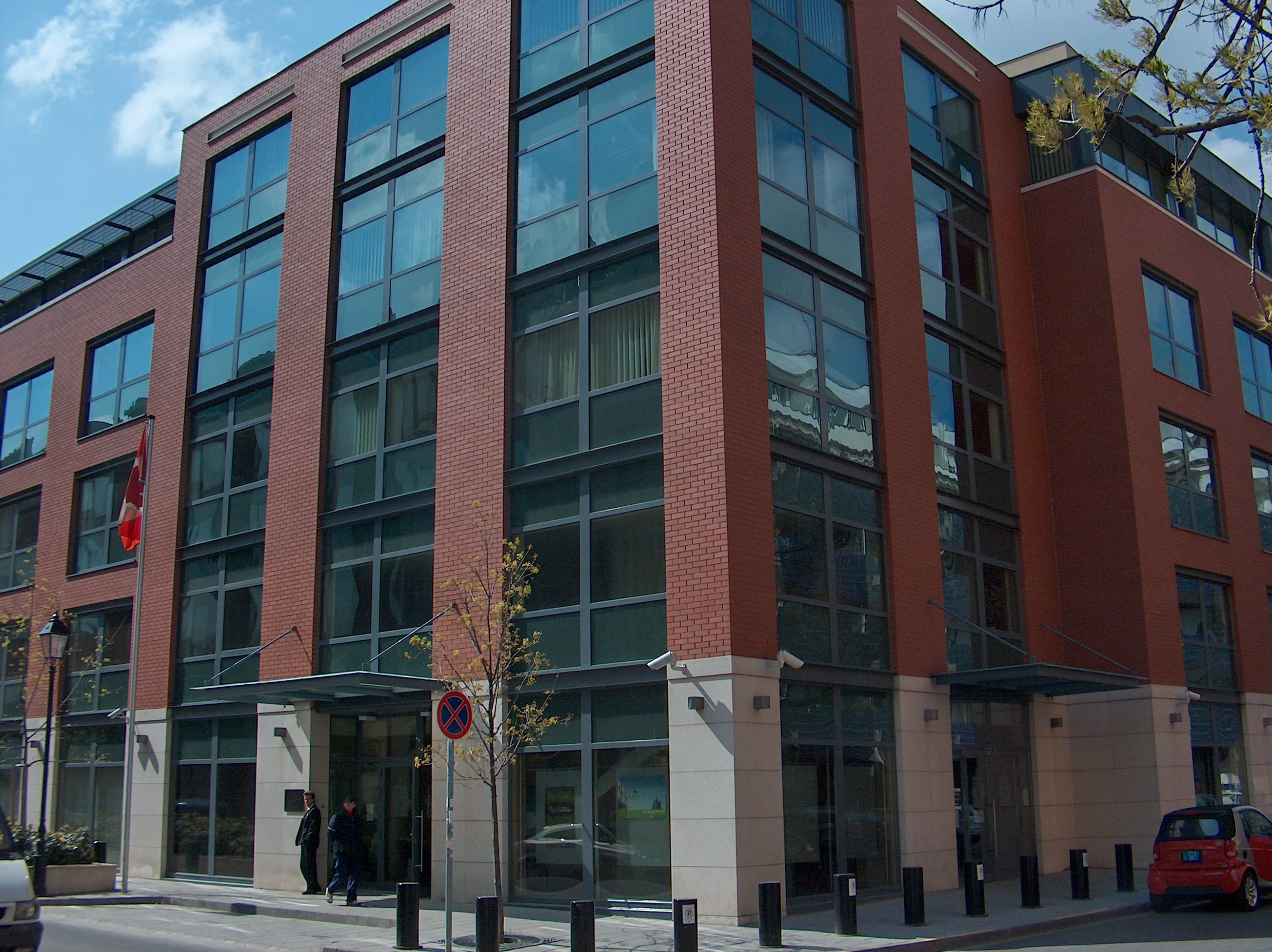
Embassy in Budapest

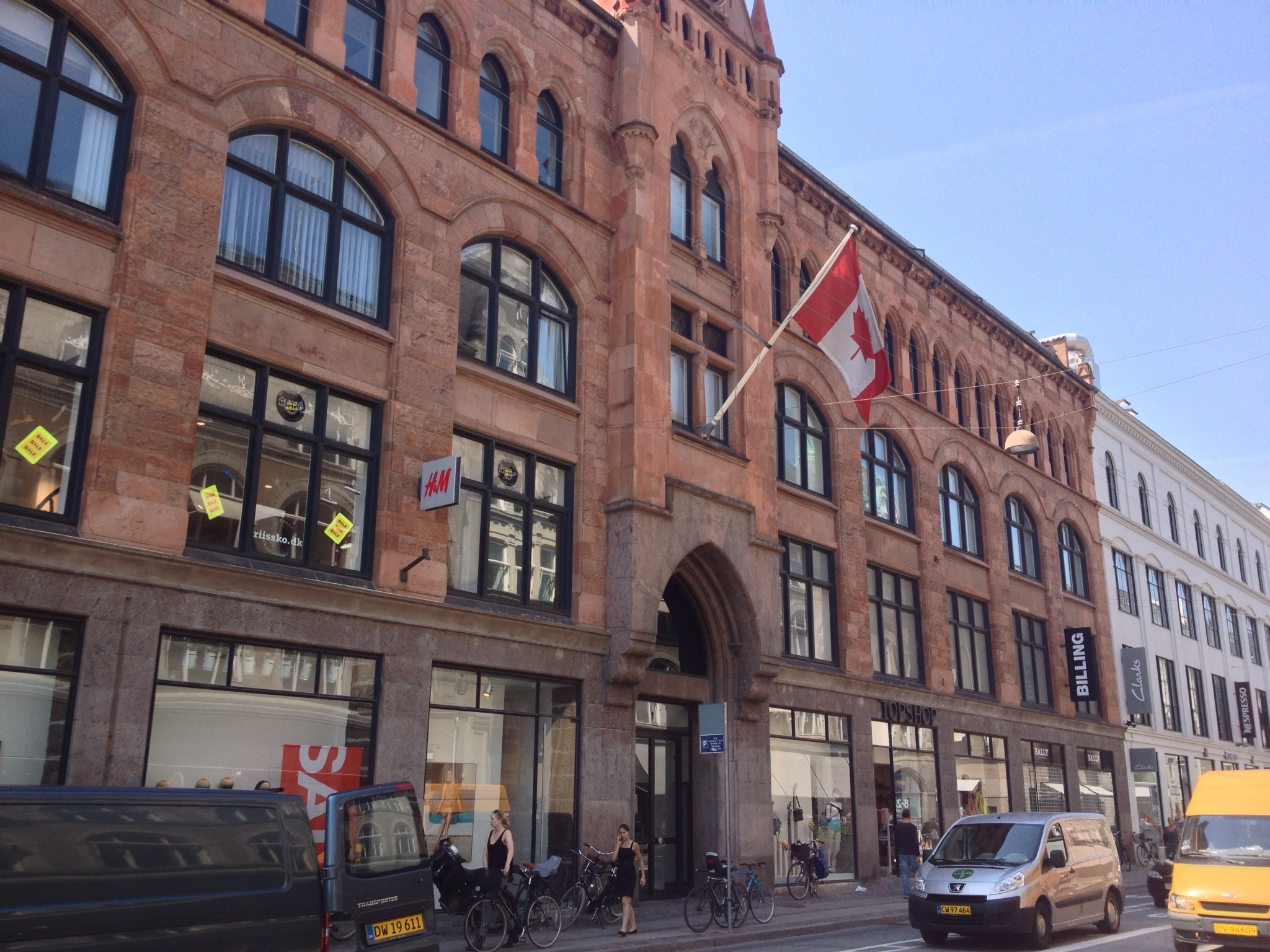
Embassy in Copenhagen

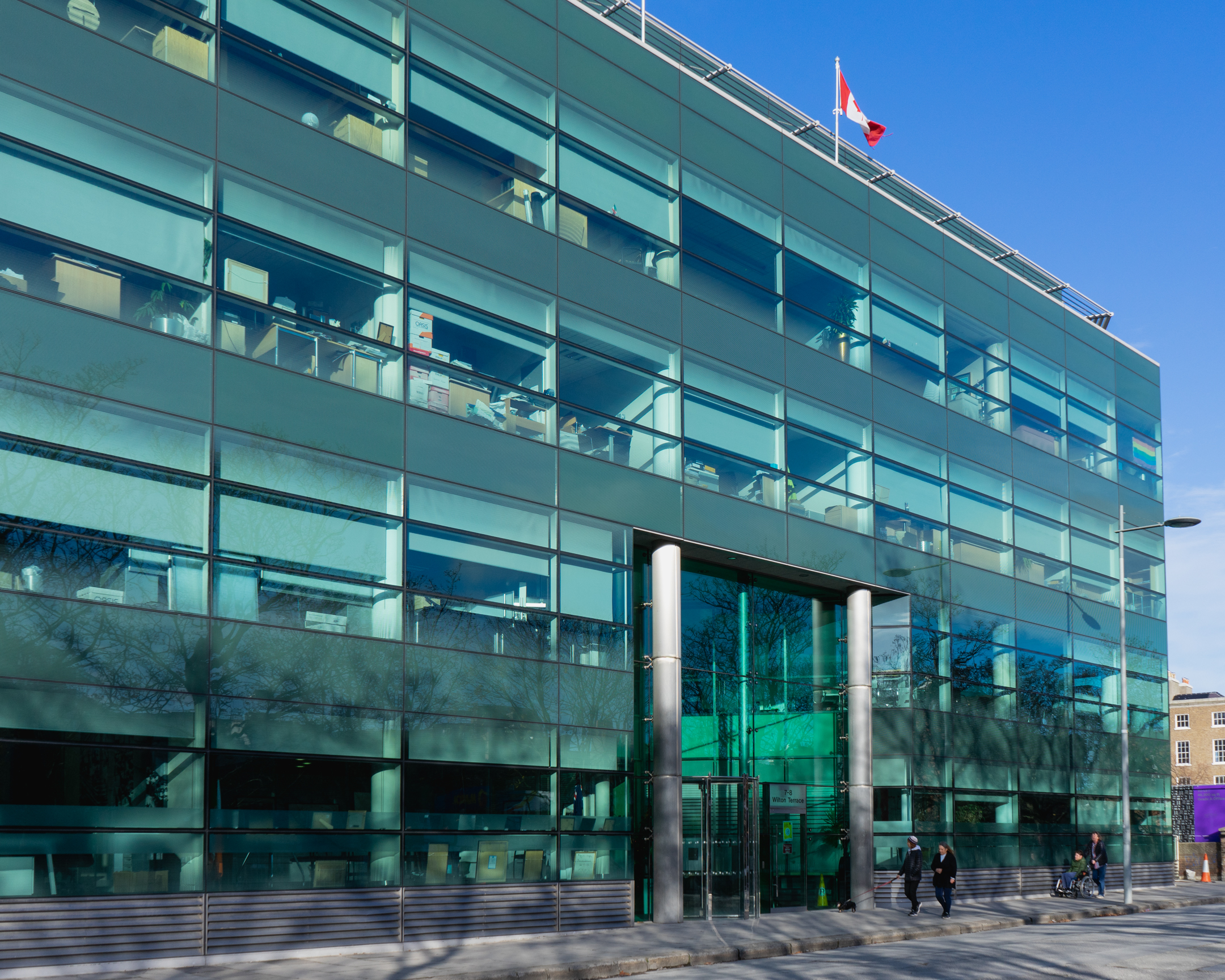
Embassy in Dublin

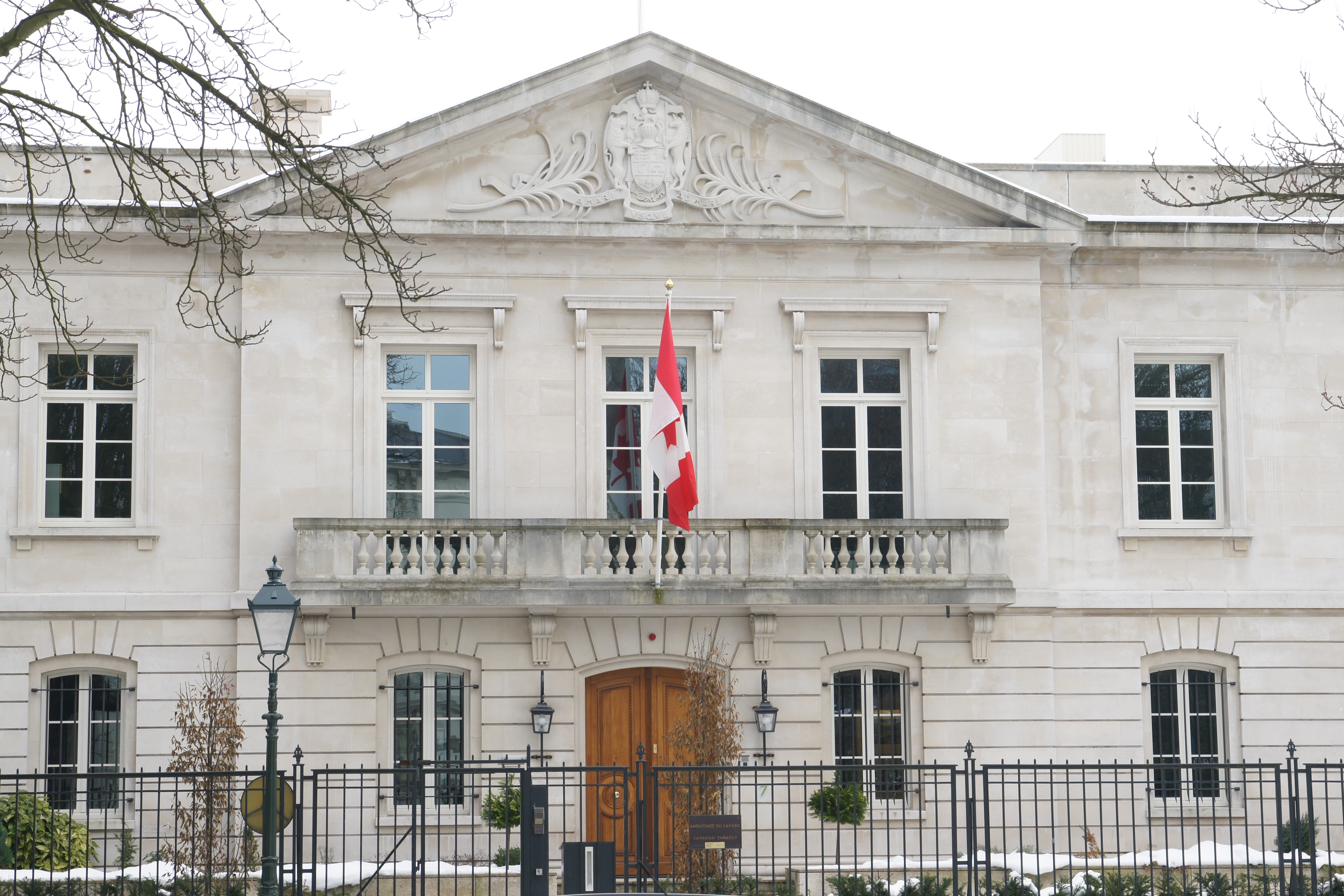
Embassy in The Hague

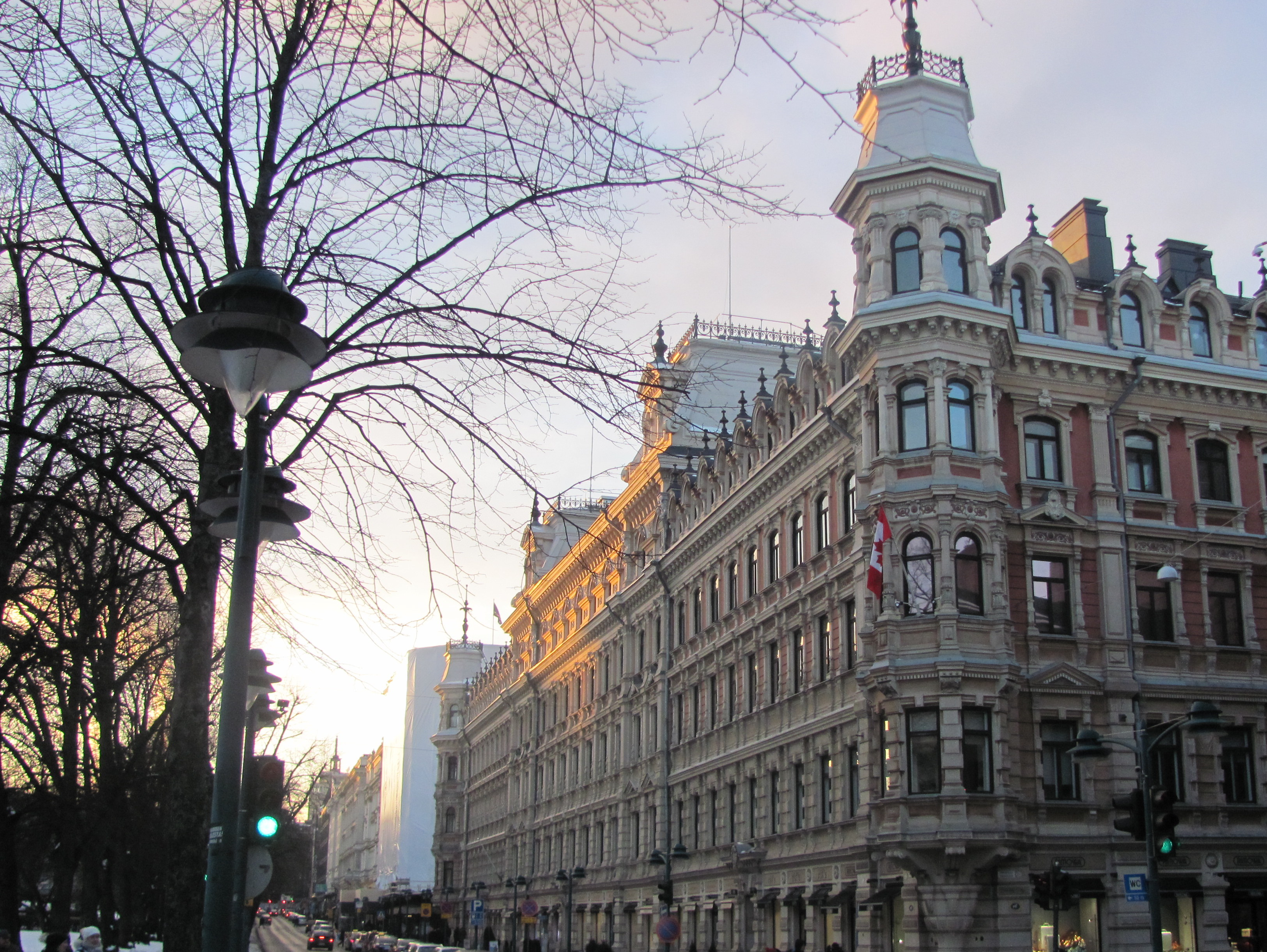
Embassy in Helsinki

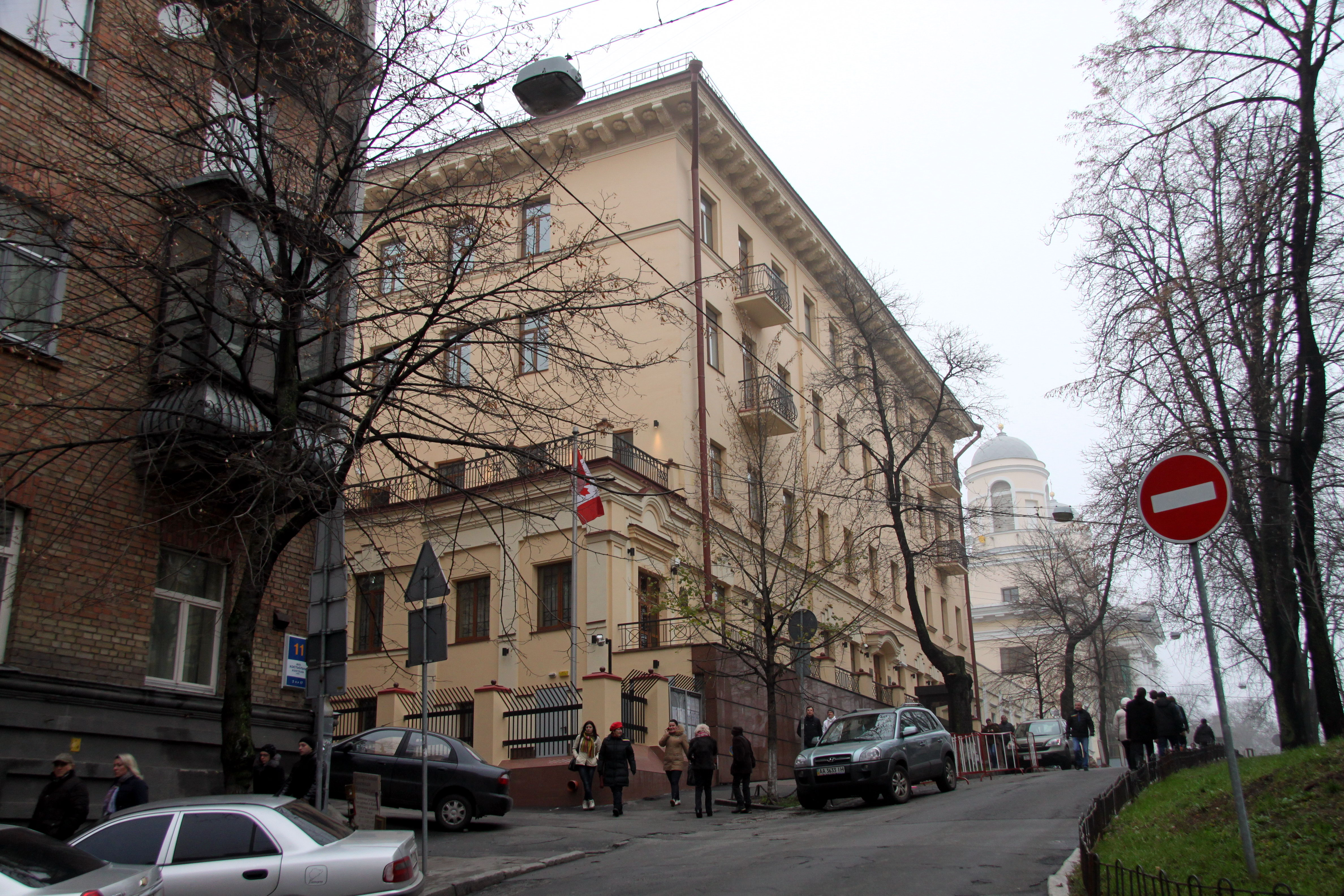
Embassy in Kyiv

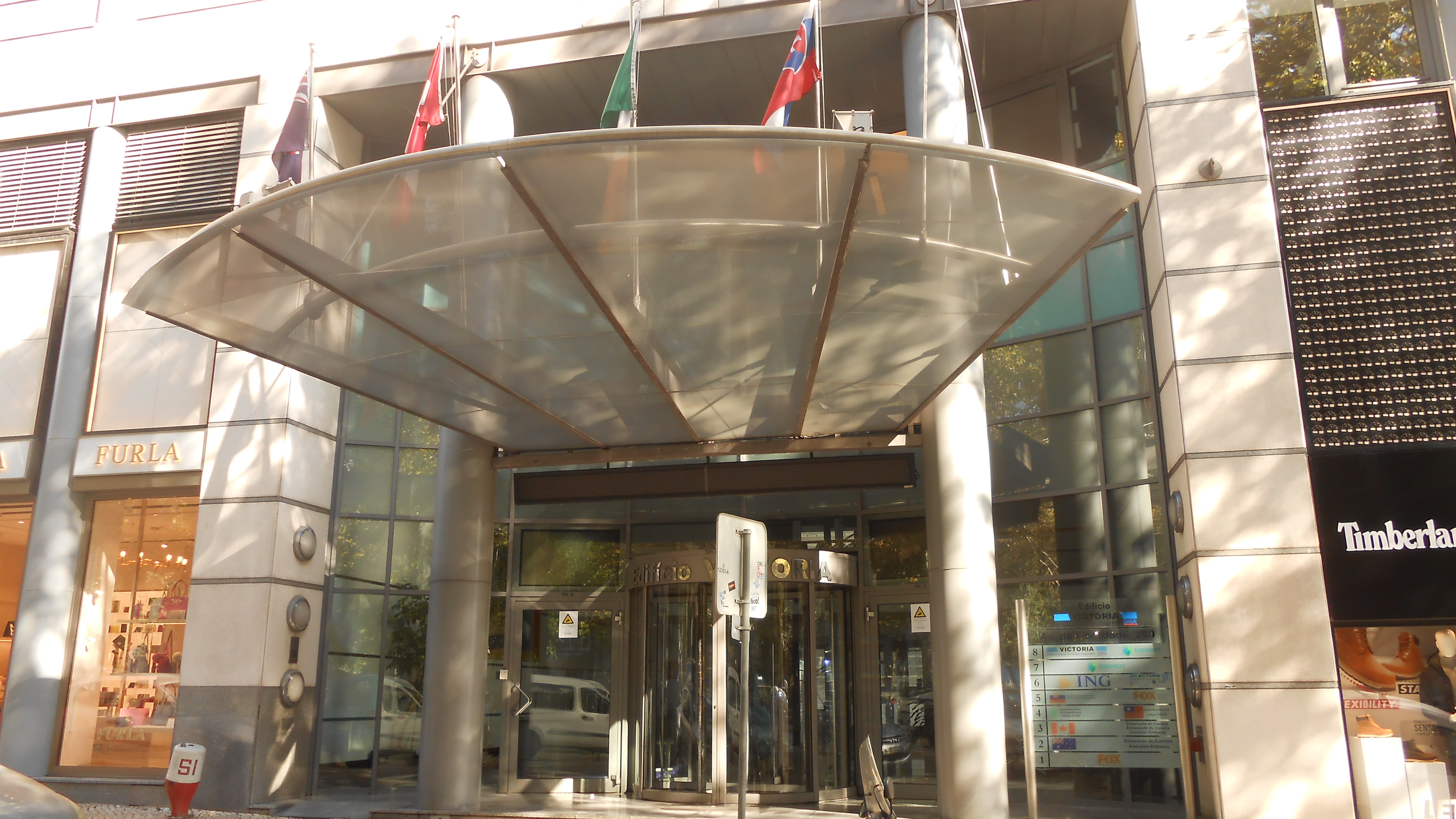
Building hosting the Embassy in Lisbon

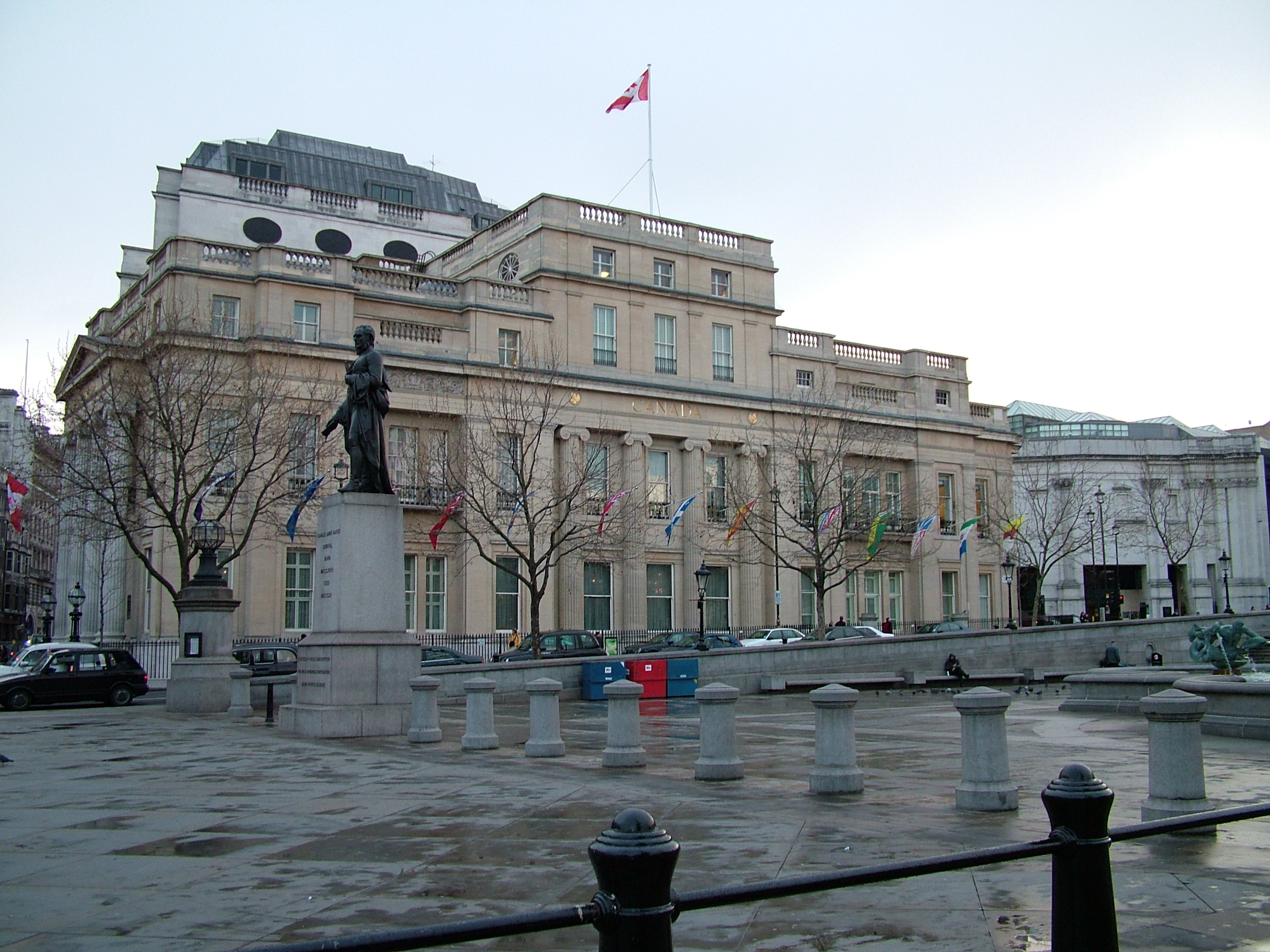
High Commission in London

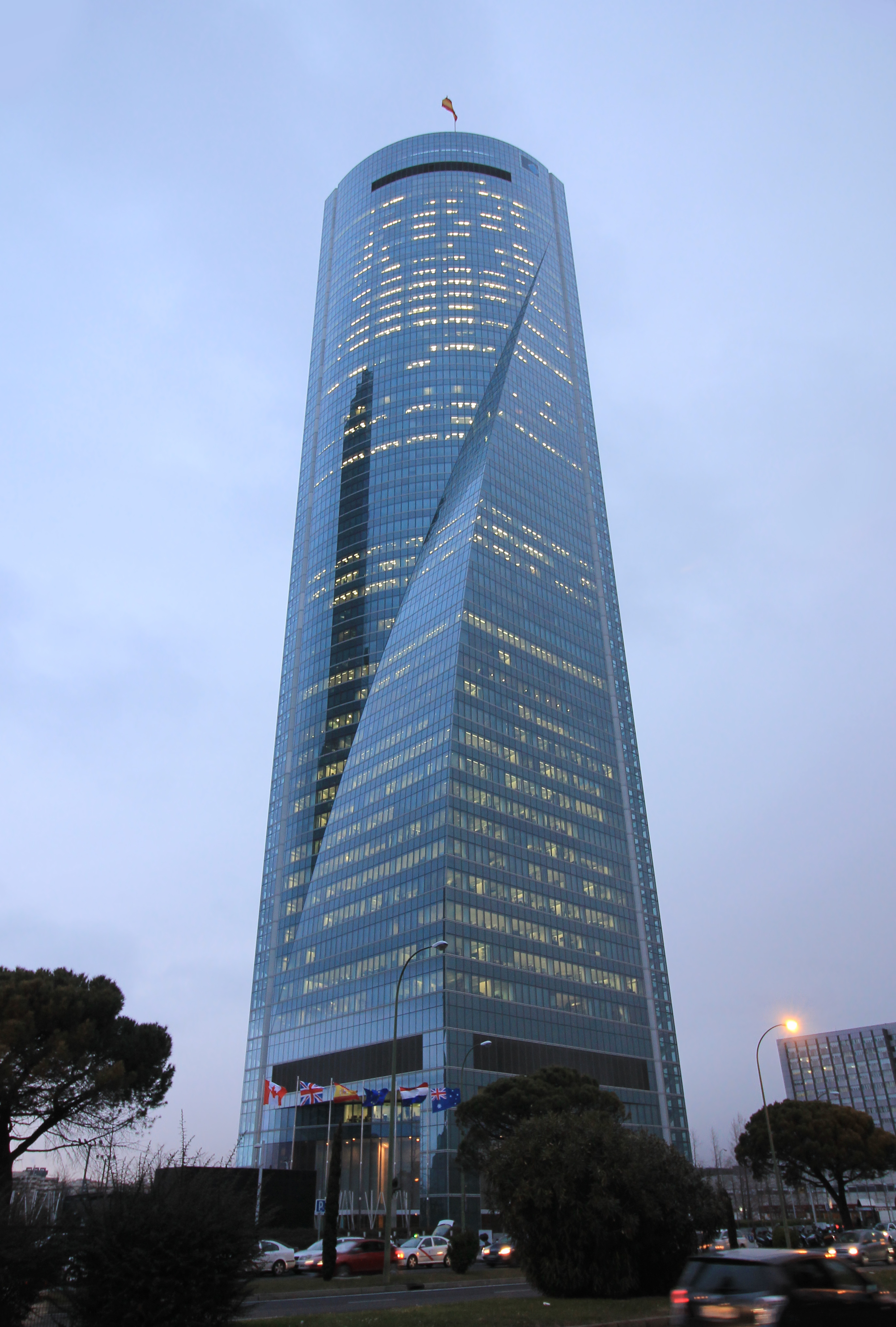
Building hosting the Embassy in Madrid

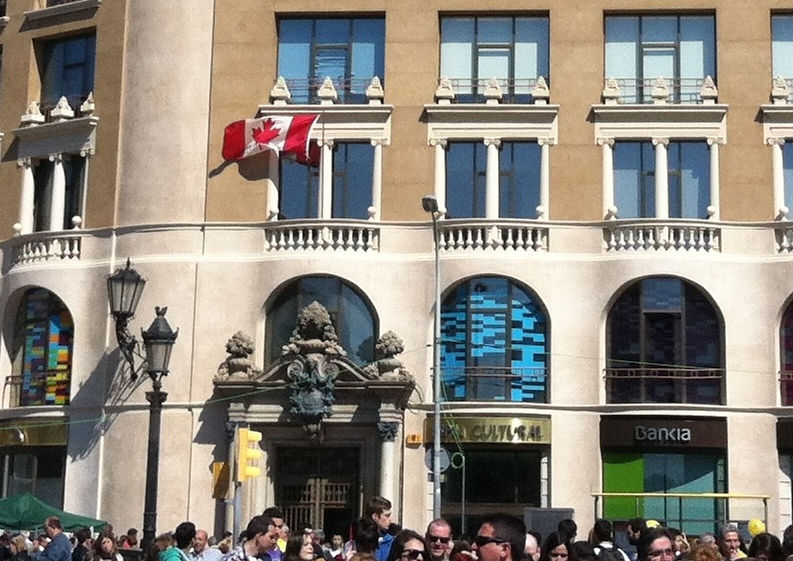
Consulate in Barcelona

Building hosting the Embassy in Moscow

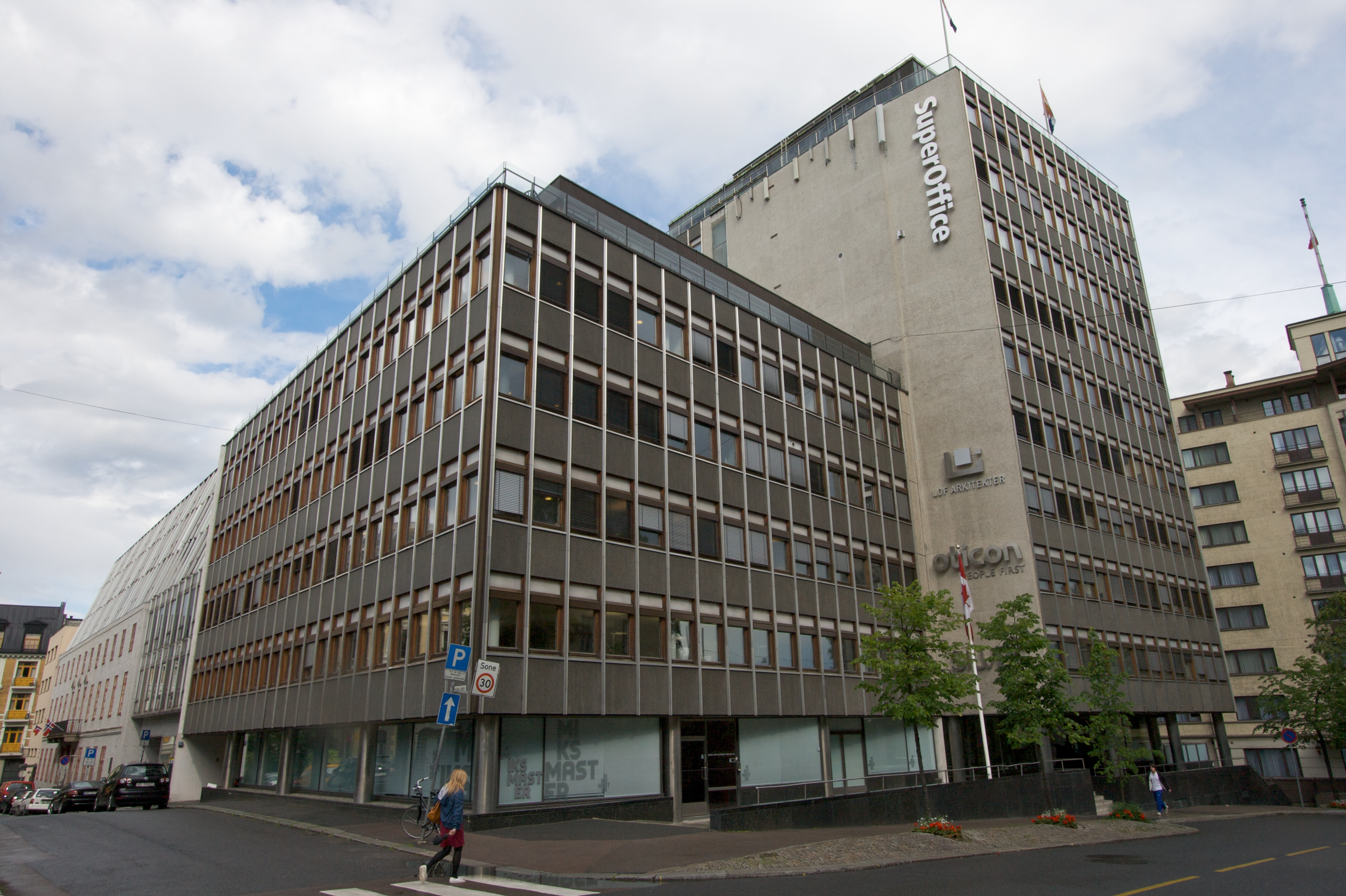
Embassy in Oslo

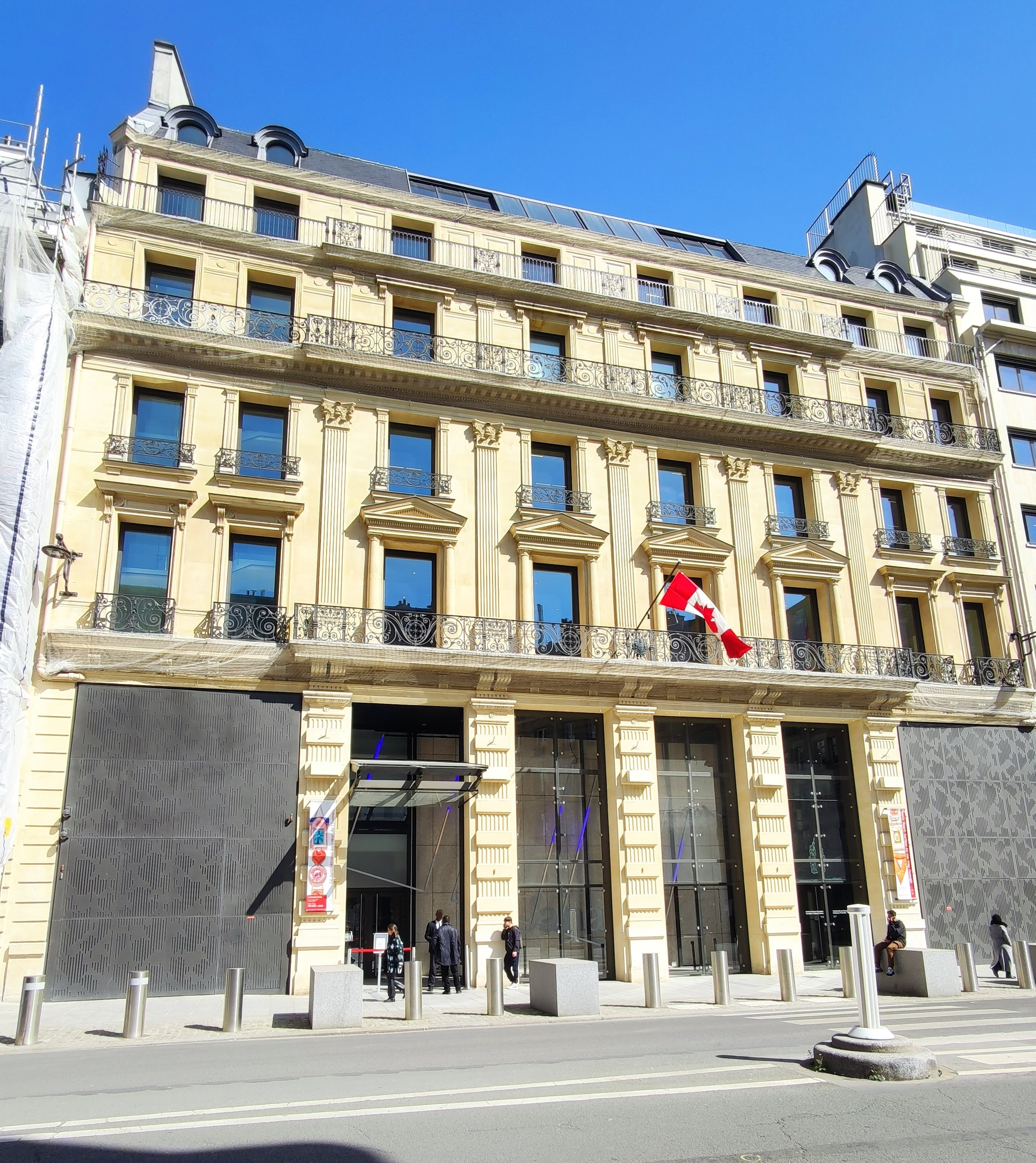
Embassy in Paris

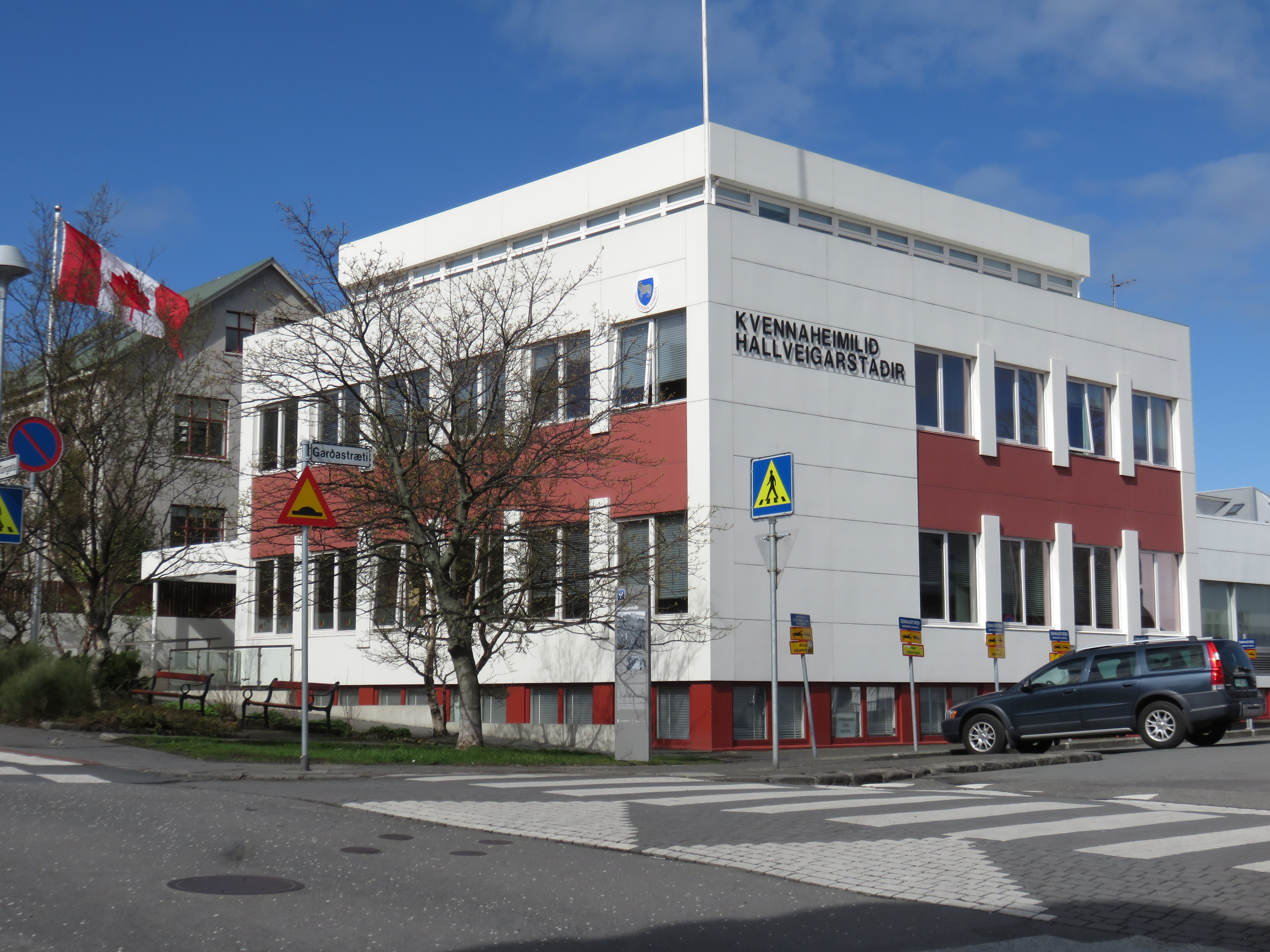
Embassy in Reykjavík

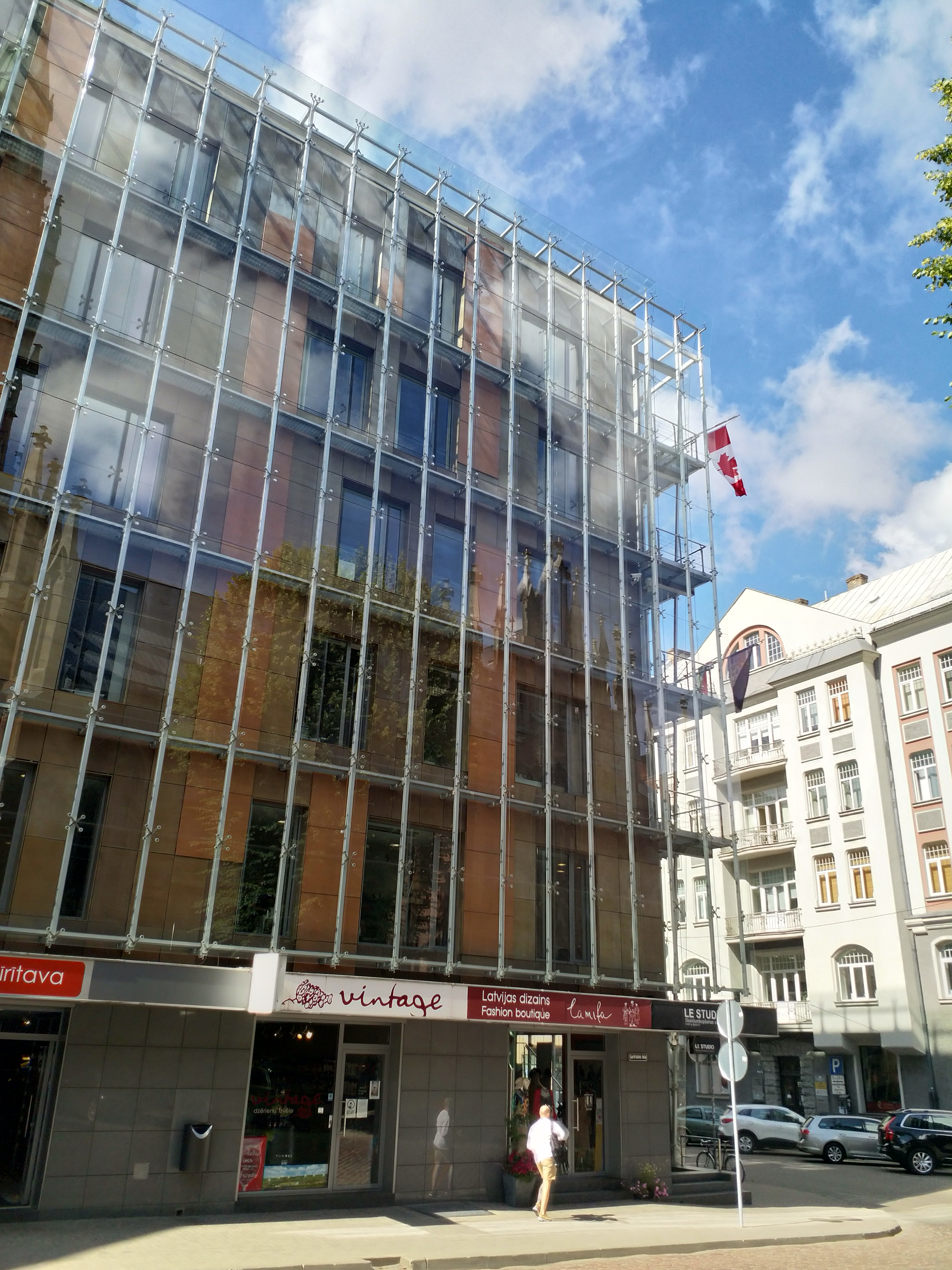
Embassy in Riga

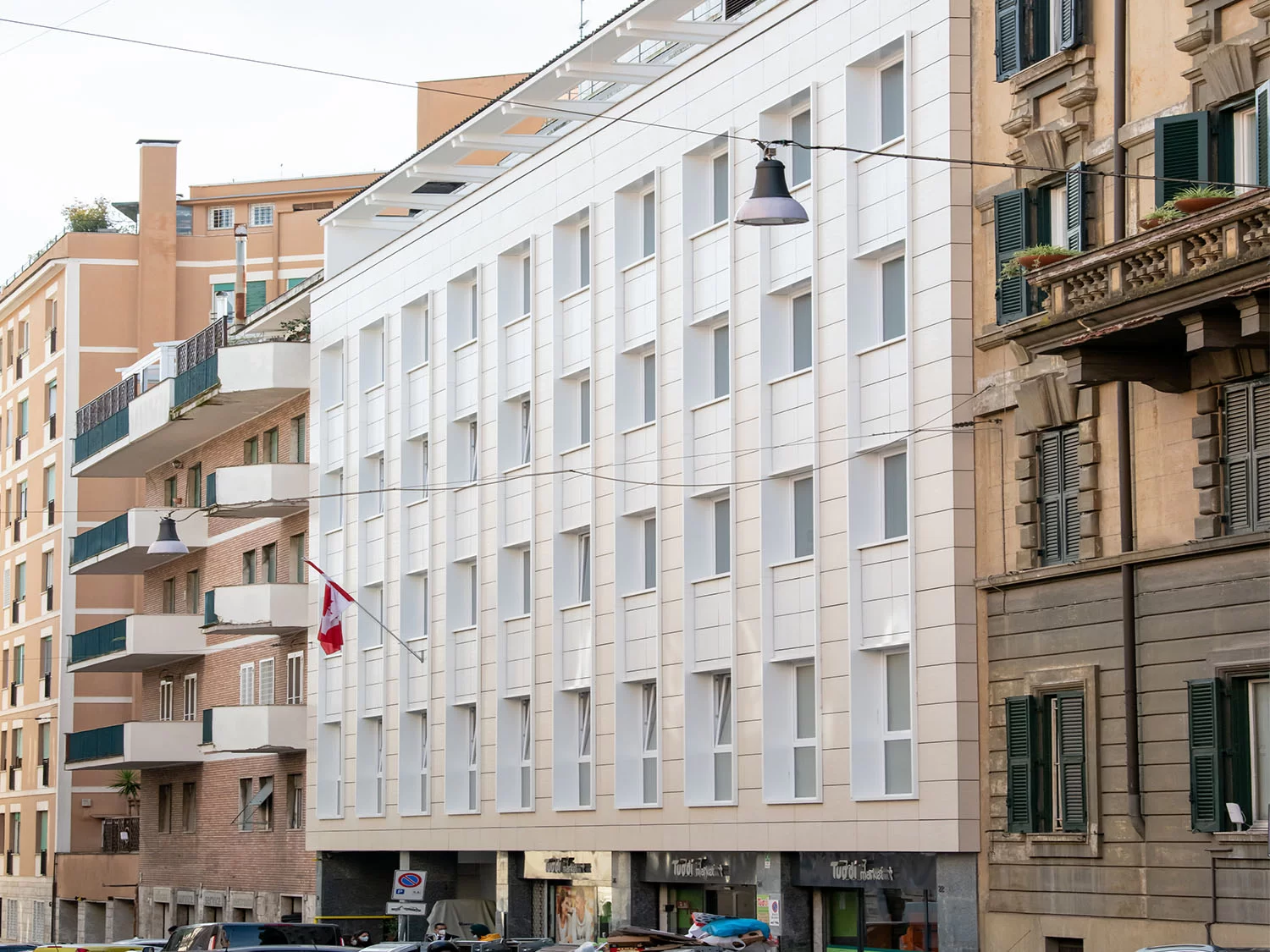
Embassy in Rome

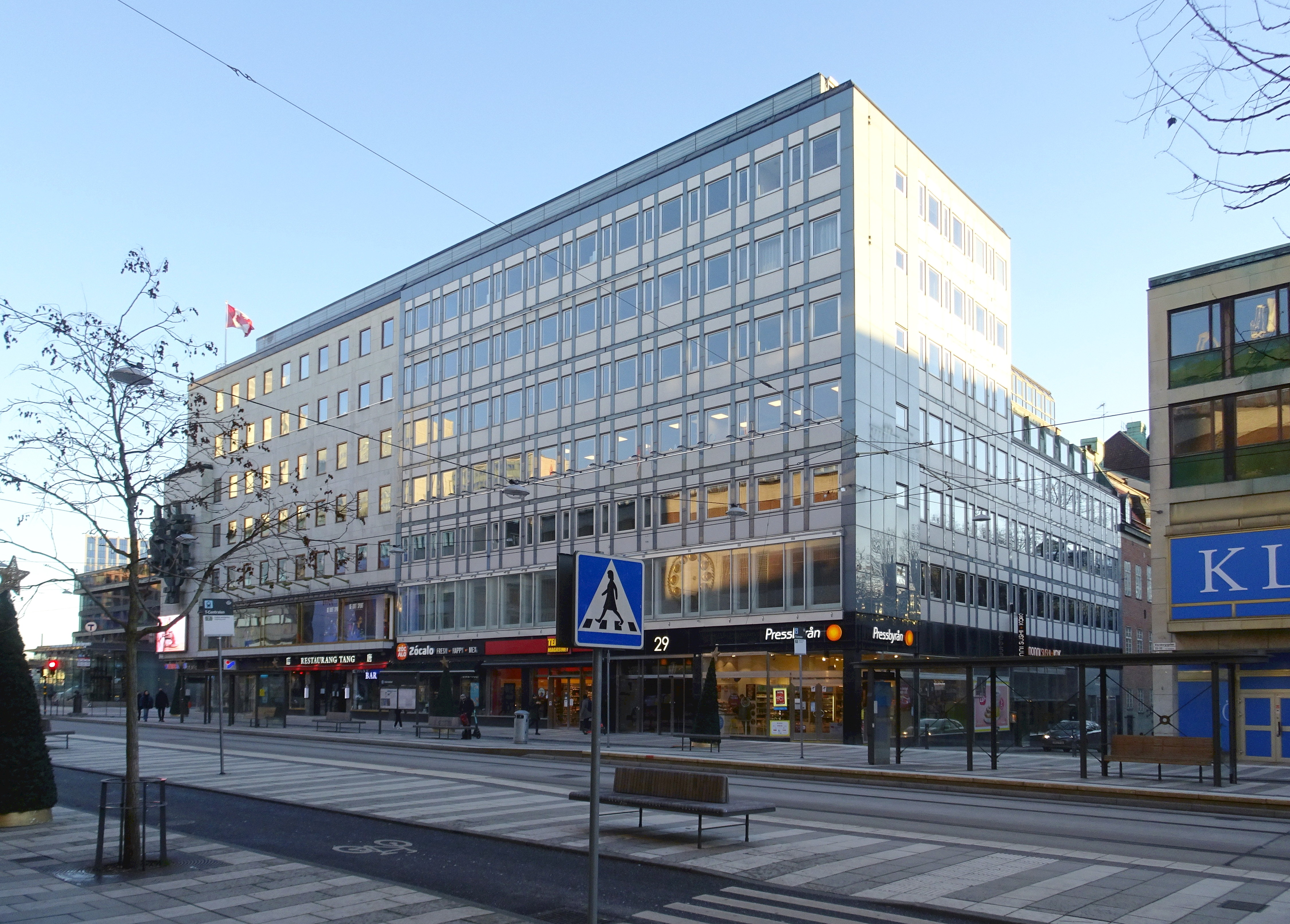
Embassy in Stockholm

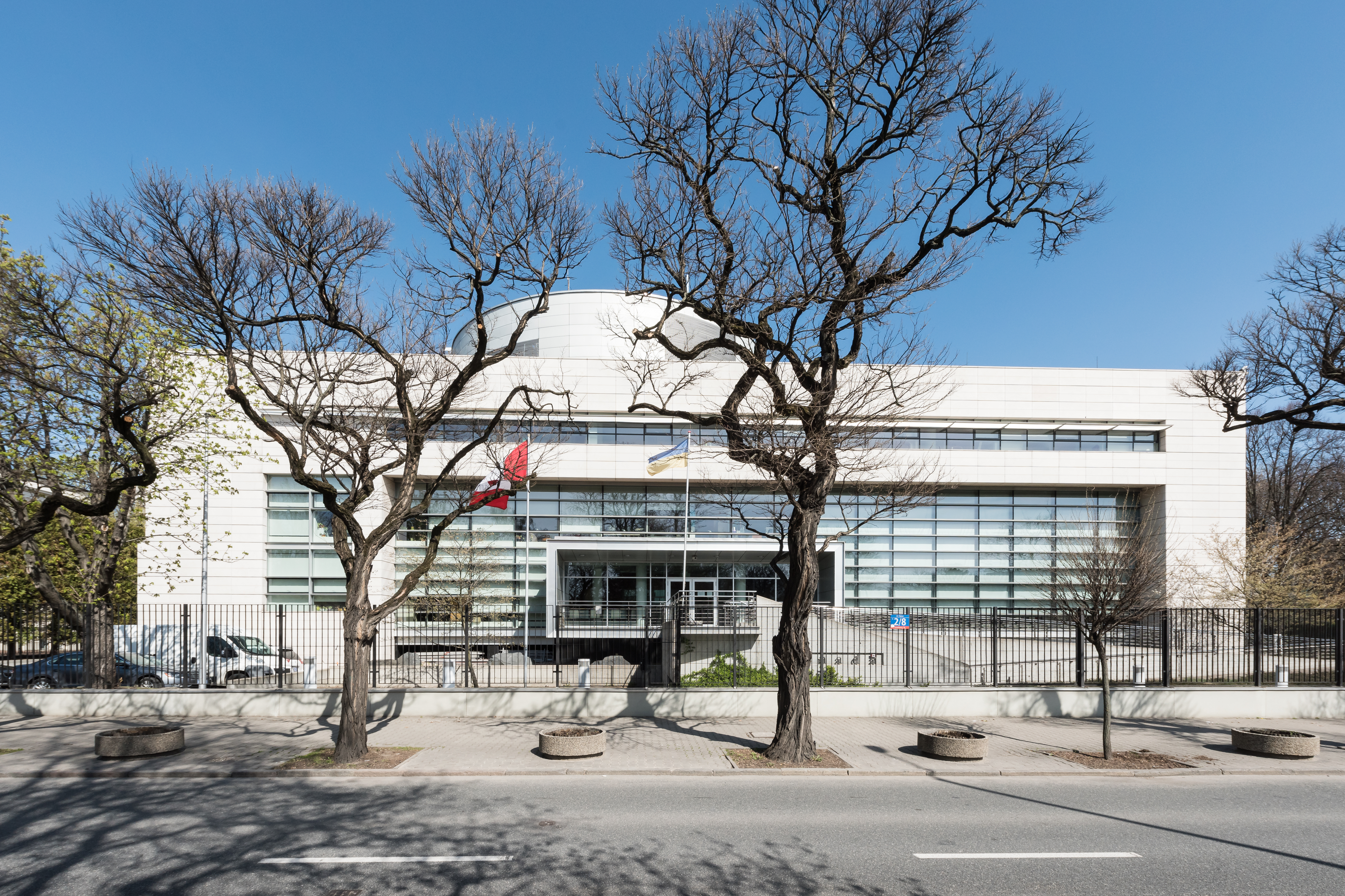
Embassy in Warsaw

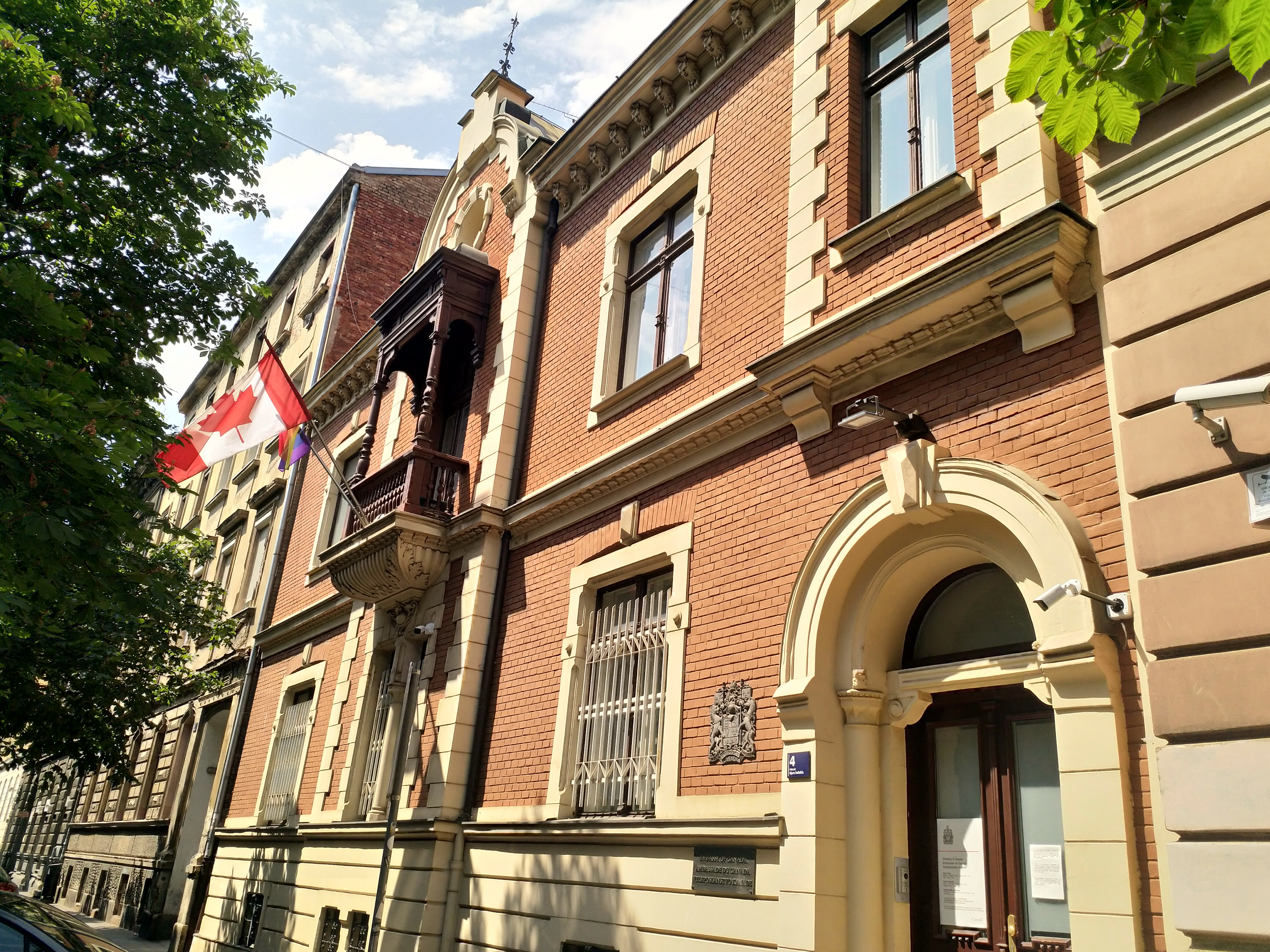
Embassy in Zagreb

=== Oceania ===
Host country	Host city	Mission	Concurrent accreditation	Ref.
Australia	Canberra	High Commission	Countries: Marshall Islands; Micronesia; Nauru; Papua New Guinea; Solomon Islands; Vanuatu	
Australia	Sydney	Consulate-General	Countries: Marshall Islands; Micronesia; Nauru; Papua New Guinea; Solomon Islands; Vanuatu	
Fiji	Suva	High Commission		
New Zealand	Wellington	High Commission	Countries: Cook Islands; Kiribati; Niue; Samoa; Tonga; Tuvalu	

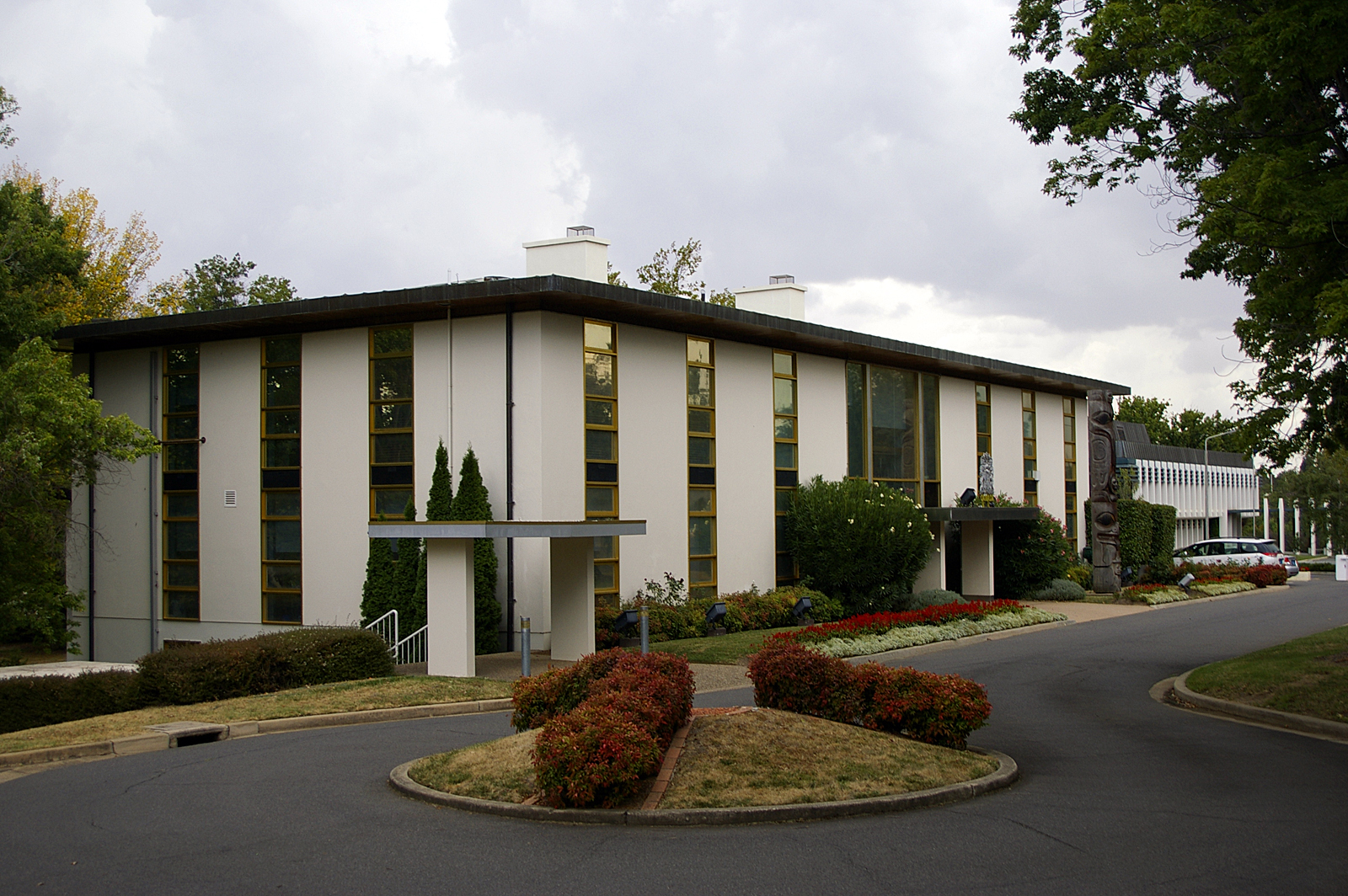
High Commission in Canberra

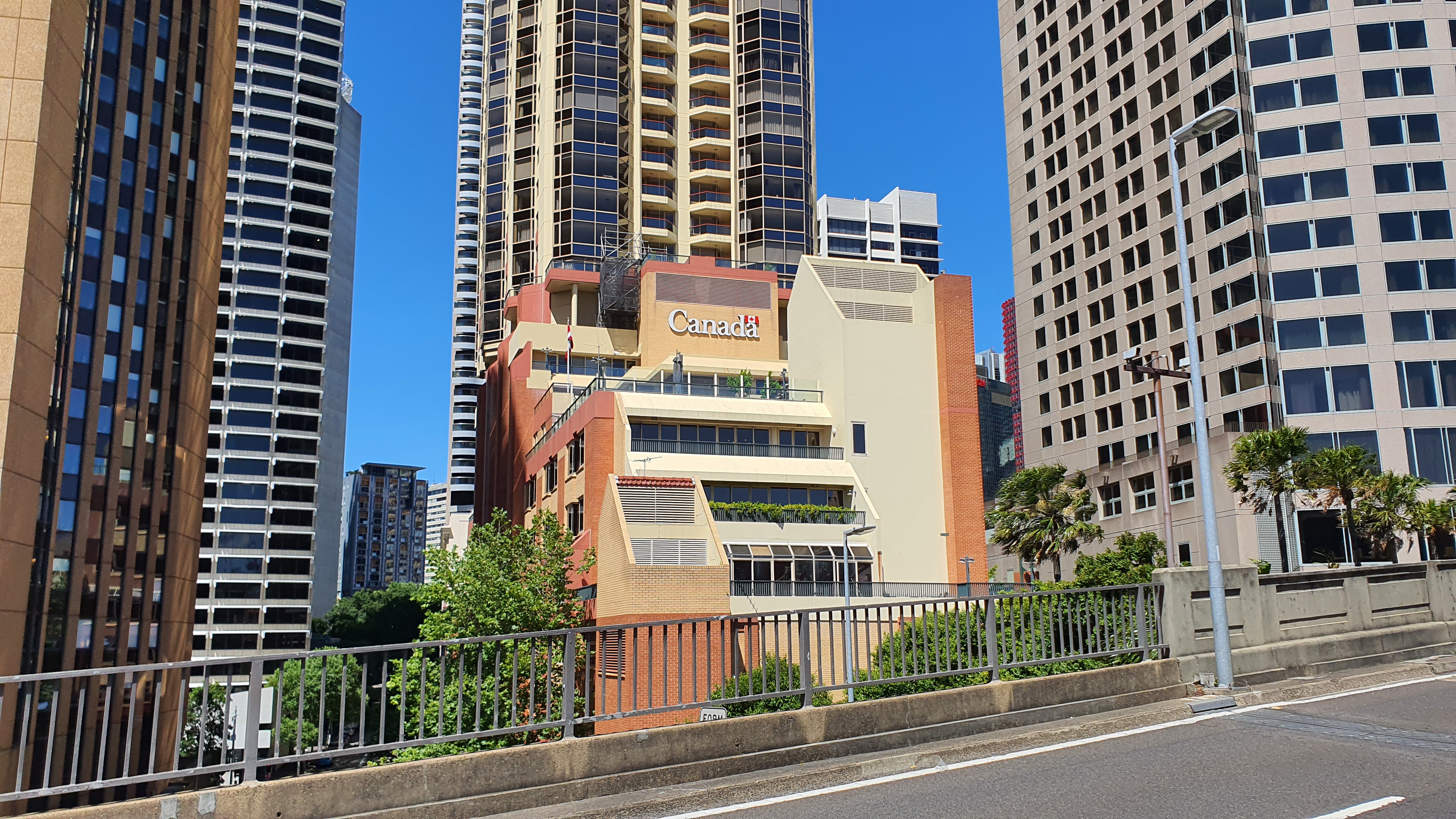
Consulate-General in Sydney

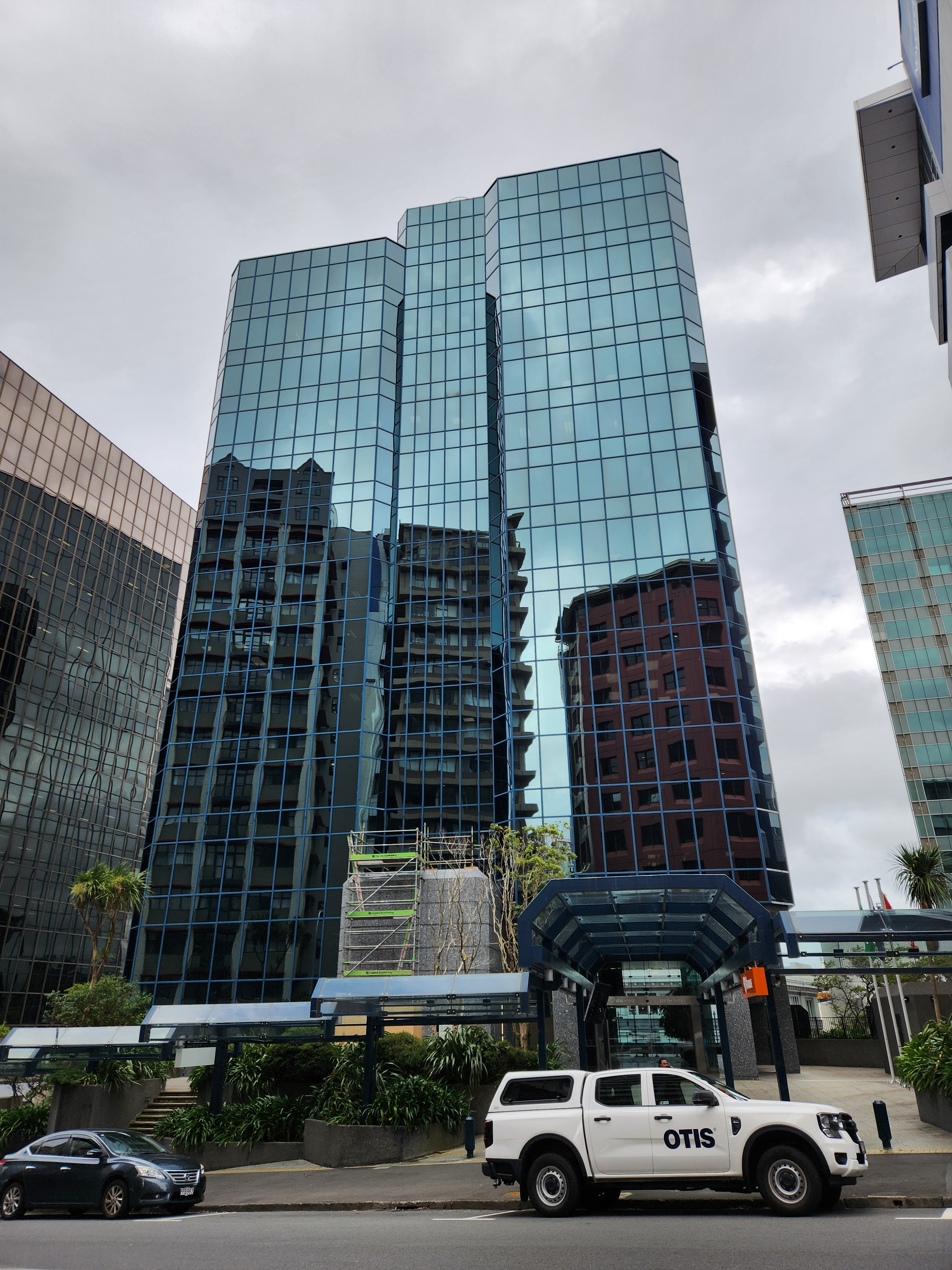
Building hosting the High Commission in Wellington

=== Multilateral organizations ===
Organization	Host city	Host country	Mission	Concurrent accreditation	Ref.
International Civil Aviation Organization (ICAO)	Montreal	Canada	Permanent Mission		
North Atlantic Treaty Organization (NATO)	Brussels	Belgium	Permanent Mission		
Organization of American States (OAS)	Washington, D.C.	United States	Permanent Mission		
Organisation for Economic Co-operation and Development (OECD)	Paris	France	Permanent Mission		
United Nations (UNO)	New York City	United States	Permanent Mission		
United Nations (UNO)	Geneva	Switzerland	Permanent Mission		
UNESCO	Paris	France	Permanent Delegation		

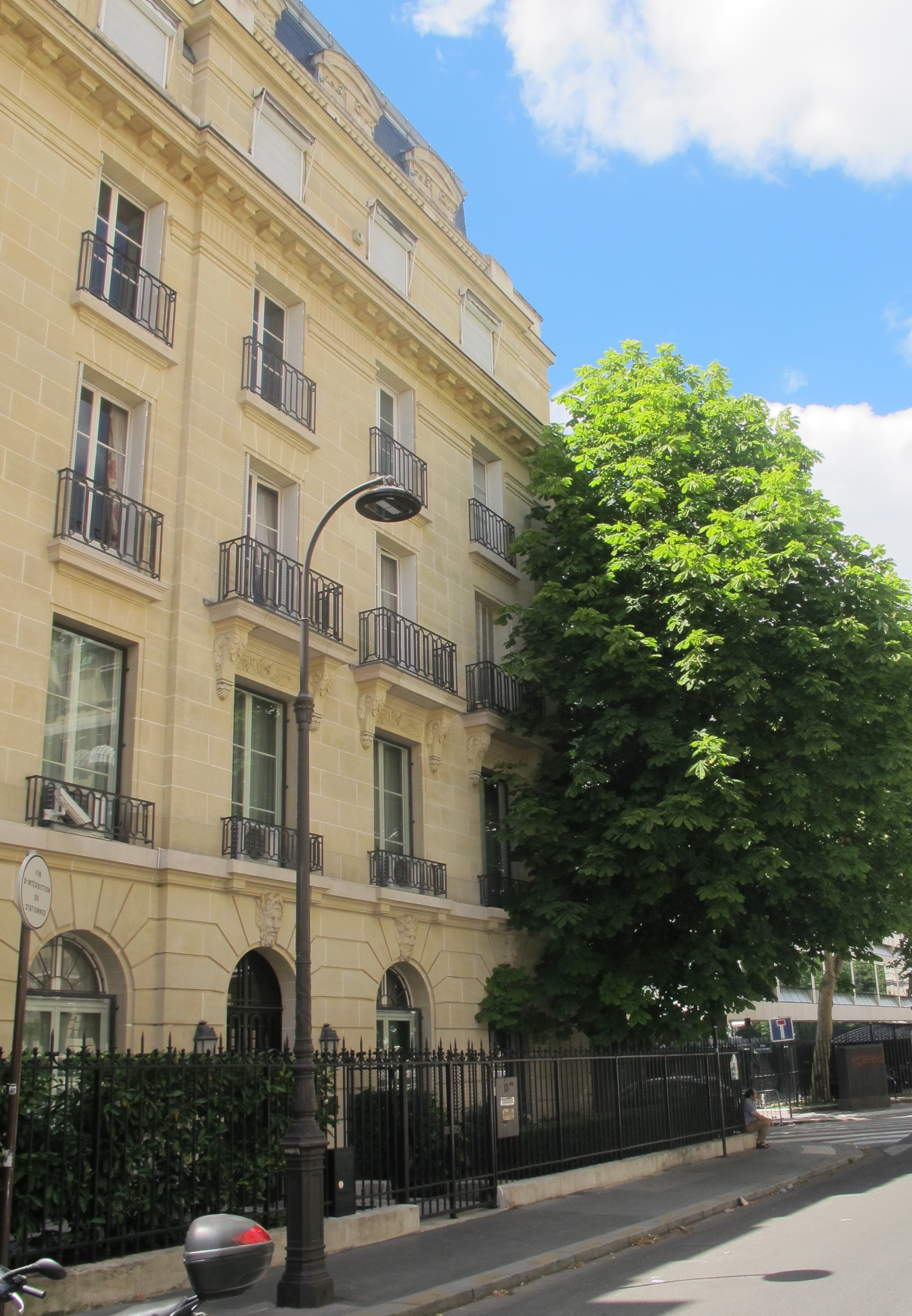
Permanent Mission to the OECD in Paris

== Missions to open ==
Host country	Host city	Mission	Ref.
United States	Anchorage, Alaska	Consulate-General	

== Closed missions ==
=== Africa ===
Host country	Host city	Mission	Year closed	Ref.
Libya	Tripoli	Embassy (Note: Resident in Tunis, Tunisia)	2014	
Namibia	Windhoek	High Commission (Note: Resident in Pretoria, Gauteng, South Africa)	1993	
Niger	Niamey	Embassy (Note: Resident in Bamako, Mali)	Unknown	
South Sudan	Juba	Embassy	2026	
Sudan	Khartoum	Embassy (Note: Resident in Addis Ababa, Ethiopia)	2023	

=== Americas ===
Host country	Host city	Mission	Year closed	Ref.
Newfoundland	St. John's	High Commission	1949	
United States	Buffalo	Consulate-General	2012	
United States	Philadelphia	Consulate-General	2012	
Venezuela	Caracas	Embassy (Note: Resident in Bogotá, Colombia)	2019	

=== Asia ===
Host country	Host city	Mission	Year closed	Ref.
Afghanistan	Kabul	Embassy (Note: Resident in Islamabad, Pakistan)	2021	
Iran	Tehran	Embassy (Note: Resident in Ankara, Turkey)	2012	
South Vietnam (Note: The embassy closed down in 1975, in the midst of the Fall of Saigon, which marked the end of the Vietnam War and the start of a transition period to the formal reunification of Vietnam.)	Saigon	Embassy (Note: Continues as a consulate-general in Ho Chi Minh.)	1975	
Syria	Damascus	Embassy (Note: Resident in Beirut, Lebanon)	2012	

=== Europe ===
Host country	Host city	Mission	Year closed	Ref.
Bosnia and Herzegovina	Sarajevo	Embassy (Note: Resident in Budapest, Hungary)	2009	

== See also ==
- Foreign relations of Canada
- List of diplomatic missions in Canada
- Visa policy of Canada
