= Singapore–European Union relations =

Singapore-European Union relations
- European Union: Singapore

Singapore and European Union relations refers to the bilateral relations between the Republic of Singapore and the European Union. The two entities generally maintain good relations. Their leaders hold regular exchanges, and Singapore has an extensive network of embassies within the European Union. Singapore's relations with the European Union date back to Singapore's independence in 1965, and to date, they have signed multiple agreements.

== Economic relations ==
The EU views Singapore as a crucial partner financially in a quickly developing region. Singapore remains the EU's most important economic partner in the Association of Southeast Asian Nations (ASEAN), and is one if its top partners globally.

=== European Union-Singapore Free Trade Agreement ===
The European Union-Singapore Free Trade Agreement (EUSFTA), which was first proposed in 2013, is regarded by some as "the cornerstone of economic ties." It was signed on 19 October 2018. It aims to remove barriers to trade and investment in the EU and Singapore. The EUSFTA, which is pending ratification, would be the first bilateral pact between the EU and an ASEAN nation. The agreement was met with widespread approval with many companies welcoming the agreement. The agreement might lead the way to more similar pacts in Asia.

Among other things, the agreement would reduce tariffs for the importing and exporting of goods between Singapore and the EU. Business in both areas may also bid on government projects. All ASEAN products would be considered as being from Singapore when determining tariff rates.

== Expatriatism ==
There are many expatriates from Singapore living in the EU and vice versa, and there are numerous resources available to help in the process of expatriation. There are also many agencies catering to expatriates. Expatriates usually have a great relationship with their host country.

== Human rights and democracy ==
The European Union and Singapore have very different policies regarding human rights, but they still maintain good relations. One example is the death penalty. The European Union is widely opposed to the death penalty, and considers that the abolition of the death penalty would lead to an increase in human dignity and the development of human rights. Singapore, on the other hand, imposes the death penalty for crimes such as drug trafficking and murder. Occasionally, this ignites a discussion of human rights and the morality of the death penalty.

== Singapore's foreign relations with EU member states ==
- Austria
- Belgium
- Bulgaria
- Croatia
- Cyprus
- Czech Republic
- Denmark
- Estonia
- Finland
- France
- Germany
- Greece
- Hungary
- (Republic of Ireland) Ireland
- Italy
- Latvia
- Lithuania
- Luxembourg
- Malta
- Netherlands
- Poland
- Portugal
- Romania
- Slovakia
- Slovenia
- Spain
- Sweden

== See also ==
- ASEAN-European Union relations
- European Union–Singapore Free Trade Agreement
