= Foreign relations of Singapore =

Singapore is one of the few countries in the world to maintain diplomatic relations with 191 UN member states; it has no relations with the Central African Republic.

Singapore supports the concept of Southeast Asian regionalism and plays an active role in the Association of Southeast Asian Nations (ASEAN), of which it is a founding member.

Being a key member of ASEAN and a global hub, Singapore maintains favourable relations with many countries, and embodies building friendships and mutual benefits in its foreign policy. The nation works closely with neighboring and regional countries, specifically in Asia-Pacific, and consistently supports international initiatives to maintain peace, security and order. It is part of the non-aligned movement and adopts a balanced position regarding major power contestation. Due to its status, Singapore is the headquarters of the Asia-Pacific Economic Cooperation (APEC) Secretariat, the Pacific Economic Cooperation Council (PECC) Secretariat, and is the host city of many international conferences and events. Singapore is also a member of the United Nations, World Trade Organization, East Asia Summit, Non-Aligned Movement, the Commonwealth of Nations and a founding member of the Forum on Small States (FOSS).

Due to geographical reasons, relations with Malaysia and Indonesia are most important. Historical baggage, including separation from Malaysia and Konfrontasi with Indonesia, have caused a siege mentality of sorts. Singapore enjoys good relations with the United Kingdom which shares ties in the Five Power Defence Arrangements (FPDA) along with Malaysia, Australia and New Zealand. Singapore also enjoys robust defense ties with the United States while simultaneously maintaining good relations with China. Additionally, it is one of the few countries to establish relations with both North Korea and the United States.

As part of its role in the United Nations, Singapore held a rotational seat on the UN Security Council from 2001 to 2002. Singapore has consistently supported the 'rules-based international order' and it has participated in UN peacekeeping/observer missions in Kuwait, Angola, Kenya, Cambodia and Timor-Leste.

== Timeline ==
- 7 August 1965 – Singapore and Malaysia sign the separation agreement.
- 9 August 1965 – The Malaysian Parliament votes to expel Singapore from the Federation; Singapore becomes an independent republic after separating from Malaysia. Malaysia immediately recognises the new independent state of Singapore.
- 9 August 1965 – Ministry of Foreign Affairs was established and S. Rajaratnam becomes Singapore's first Minister for Foreign Affairs.
- 10 August 1965 – British Prime Minister Harold Wilson sends a message to Lee Kwan Yew stating that the United Kingdom would immediately recognise Singapore.
- 13 August 1965 – The number of official recognitions rises to 10.
- 2 September 1965 – S. Rajaratnam officially applies for Singapore to join the United Nations.
- 20 September 1965 – Singapore's application to the United Nations is submitted to the United Nations Security Council by Malaysia, supported by Ivory Coast, Jordan, and the United Kingdom. Singaporean civil servant Herman Hochstadt credited the submission by Malaysia as overcoming a potential veto by the Soviet Union.
- 21 September 1965 – Singapore is admitted into the United Nations as the 117th member by the United Nations General Assembly in its 1332nd Plenary Session, with the resolution passing by acclamation. Singapore's first representative to the United Nations is Abu Bakar Pawanchee.
- 15 October 1965 – Singapore becomes the 22nd member of the Commonwealth.
- April 1966 – Indonesian President Sukarno announces that Indonesia will recognise Singapore. This was made official on 7 June, and diplomatic ties were established on 7 September.
- June 1966 – The Philippines recognised Singapore.
- 8 August 1967 – Singapore becomes a founding member of Association of Southeast Asian Nations (ASEAN).
- 17 January 1968 – Britain announces its intention to withdraw its armed forces from Singapore.
- September 1970 – Singapore is admitted into the Non-Aligned Movement.
- 14–22 January 1971 – Singapore hosts the 18th Conference of the Commonwealth Heads of Government Meeting.
- 15–16 April 1971 – Singapore, United Kingdom, Malaysia, Australia and New Zealand sign the Five Power Defence Arrangements.
- 31 October 1971 – The last British military forces withdraws from Singapore.
- November 1972 – The Constitution (Amendment) (Protection of the Sovereignty of the Republic of Singapore) Bill passes, making constitutional changes that would remove Singapore's sovereignty require a two-thirds majority in a referendum.
- 1973 – Singapore joins General Agreement on Tariffs and Trade (GATT).
- March 1981 – Singapore's Permanent Representative to the United Nations, Ambassador Tommy Koh, assumed the presidency of the Third UN Conference on the Law of the Sea.
- 3 October 1990 – Singapore and People's Republic of China establish diplomatic relations.
- 11 February 1993 – Asia Pacific Economic Cooperation Secretariat set up in Singapore.
- 26 February 1994 – Singapore and China signed an agreement to jointly develop the Suzhou Industrial Park.
- 5 May 1994 – United States media sensationalise the caning incident of American teenager Michael P. Fay who was convicted for vandalism.
- 1 January 1995 – Inauguration of World Trade Organization (WTO), Ambassador K Kesavapany is elected for a one-year term as chairman of the General Council.
- 9–13 December 1996 – Singapore hosts the 1st WTO Ministerial Conference.
- 15 January 1998 – Singapore and United States announces agreement for US ships to use a planned $35 million naval base from 2000.
- 10 October 2000 – Singapore is elected as a non-permanent member of the United Nations Security Council (UNSC) at the 55th session of the UN General Assembly.
- 14 November 2000 – Singapore and New Zealand sign Agreement on Closer Economic Partnership, Singapore's first bilateral Free Trade Agreement.
- 1 January 2001 – Singapore starts its two-year term in the United Nations Security Council.
- 15 January 2001 – A pipeline feeding gas to Singapore from Indonesia's Natuna field in South China Sea opens.
- 13 January 2002 – Singapore and Japan sign the Japan-Singapore Economic Agreement.
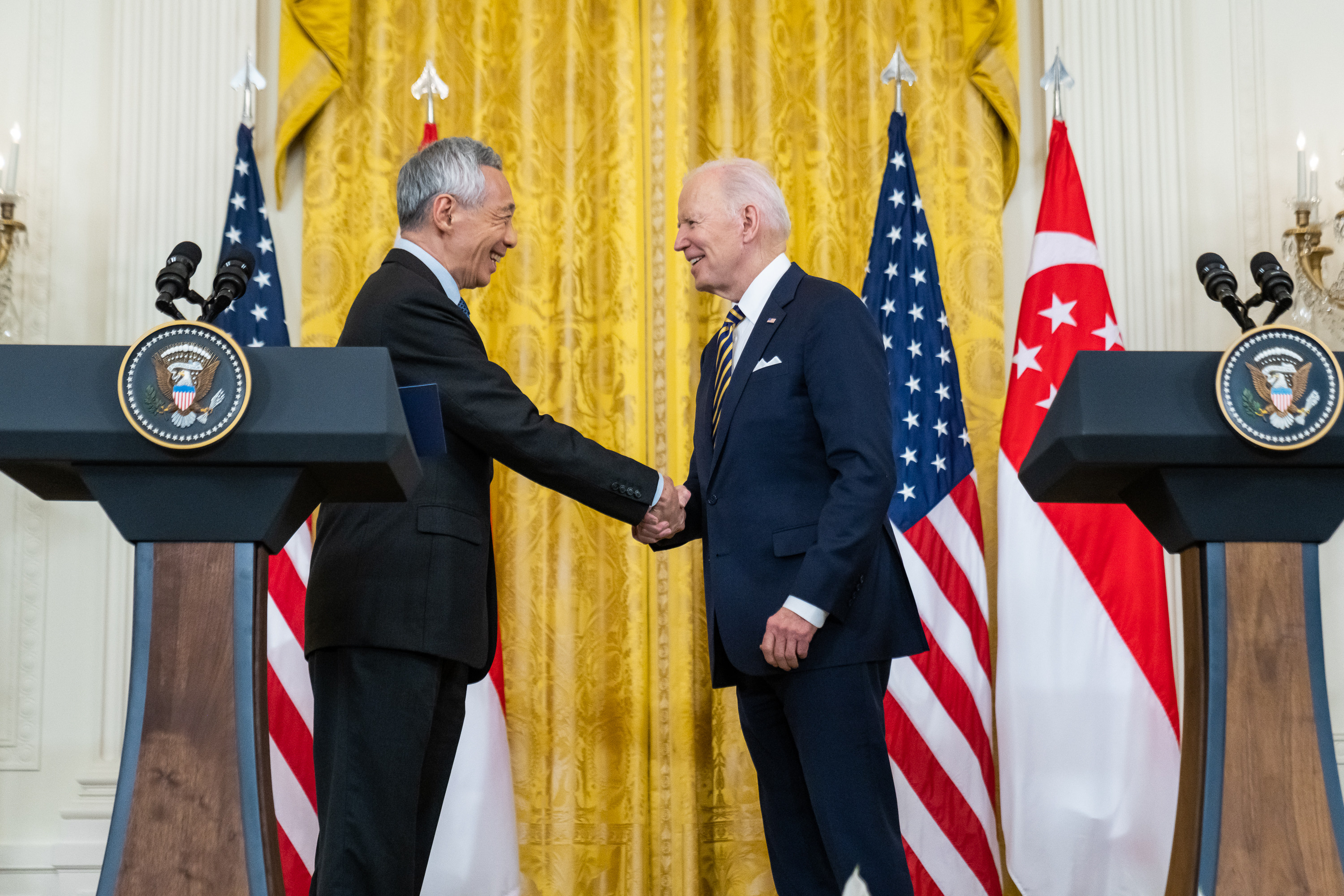
  Singaporean PM Lee Hsien Loong and U.S. President Joe Biden at the White House, March 2022.
- 6 May 2003 – Singapore and United States sign the United States-Singapore Free Trade Agreement (USS-FTA).
- 26 April 2005 – Singapore and Malaysia sign a settlement agreement concerning land reclamation in and around the Straits of Johor.
- 15–17 August 2005 – Singapore hosted a multi-national maritime interdiction exercise, codename Exercise Deep Sabre, participated by 13 countries.
- 23 August 2005 – Singapore and Australia sign a memorandum of agreement to allow Singapore Armed Forces to train on the Shoalwater Bay Training Area till 2009.
- 14 December 2005 – Singapore attends the inaugural East Asia Summit (EAS).
- 18 November 2007 – Singapore signed an agreement with China to jointly develop Tianjin Eco-city.
- 23 May 2008 – territorial dispute of Pedra Branca with Malaysia is largely settled through adjudication by International Court of Justice with Singapore getting Pedra Branca and Malaysia awarded Middle Rocks.
- 20 September 2010 – railway land owned by Malaysia through KTM is returned to Singapore in exchange for joint development of plots of land at prime locations, ending the 20-year impasse of the Points of Agreement.
- 23 November 2016 – 9 Terrex infantry carrier vehicles were detained in Kwai Chung Container Terminal at Hong Kong while en route from Taiwan. The vehicles were detained for more than two months despite diplomatic efforts by Singapore to retrieve its assets, signalling deteriorating ties with China.

== Main foreign policy themes since 1965 ==
The main themes of Singapore's foreign policy:

- Formative Years (1965-1970s): In the early years after independence, Singapore faced numerous challenges, including the need to establish its sovereignty and secure its survival. Its foreign policy focused on seeking recognition and building diplomatic relations with other countries. Singapore pursued a policy of non-alignment and sought to establish itself as a reliable partner in the international community.
- Economic Development and Trade (1970s-1980s): In the 1970s, Singapore began to prioritize economic development and trade as key pillars of its foreign policy. The government implemented pro-business policies, attracted foreign investments, and actively pursued trade agreements with various countries. Singapore also joined regional organizations like ASEAN in 1967 to enhance economic cooperation and promote stability in Southeast Asia.
- Regional Security and ASEAN (1980s-1990s): As Singapore grew economically, it became increasingly concerned about regional security. It played an active role in promoting regional stability through initiatives like the Five Power Defense Arrangements (FPDA) and the Zone of Peace, Freedom, and Neutrality (ZOPFAN). Singapore supported the establishment of the ASEAN Regional Forum (ARF) in 1994, which aimed to enhance security cooperation and dialogue among ASEAN and its partners.
- Pragmatic Diplomacy and Bilateral Relations (1990s-2000s): Singapore's foreign policy during this period emphasized pragmatic diplomacy and building strong bilateral relations with major powers. It sought to diversify its partnerships and engaged with countries like the United States, China, and India to enhance economic ties, attract investments, and promote regional stability. Singapore also hosted several high-profile international events and conferences to bolster its diplomatic profile.
- Economic Integration and Free Trade (2000s-Present): In the 2000s, Singapore continued to prioritize economic integration and free trade. It actively pursued bilateral and regional free trade agreements (FTAs) to expand market access and boost economic growth. Notable agreements include the Singapore-U.S. Free Trade Agreement (2003), the Comprehensive Economic Cooperation Agreement with India (2005), and participation in the Comprehensive and Progressive Agreement for Trans-Pacific Partnership (CPTPP).
- Global Engagement and Multilateralism: Singapore has increasingly engaged in global affairs and actively participated in multilateral institutions. It has sought to shape global norms and contribute to issues such as climate change, sustainable development, and cybersecurity. Singapore has been assessed as one of the three potential internationally leading countries on climate policy in Asia. Singapore has played an active role in organizations like the United Nations (UN), World Trade Organization (WTO), and ASEAN to advance its interests and contribute to international cooperation.

== Foreign policy approaches ==
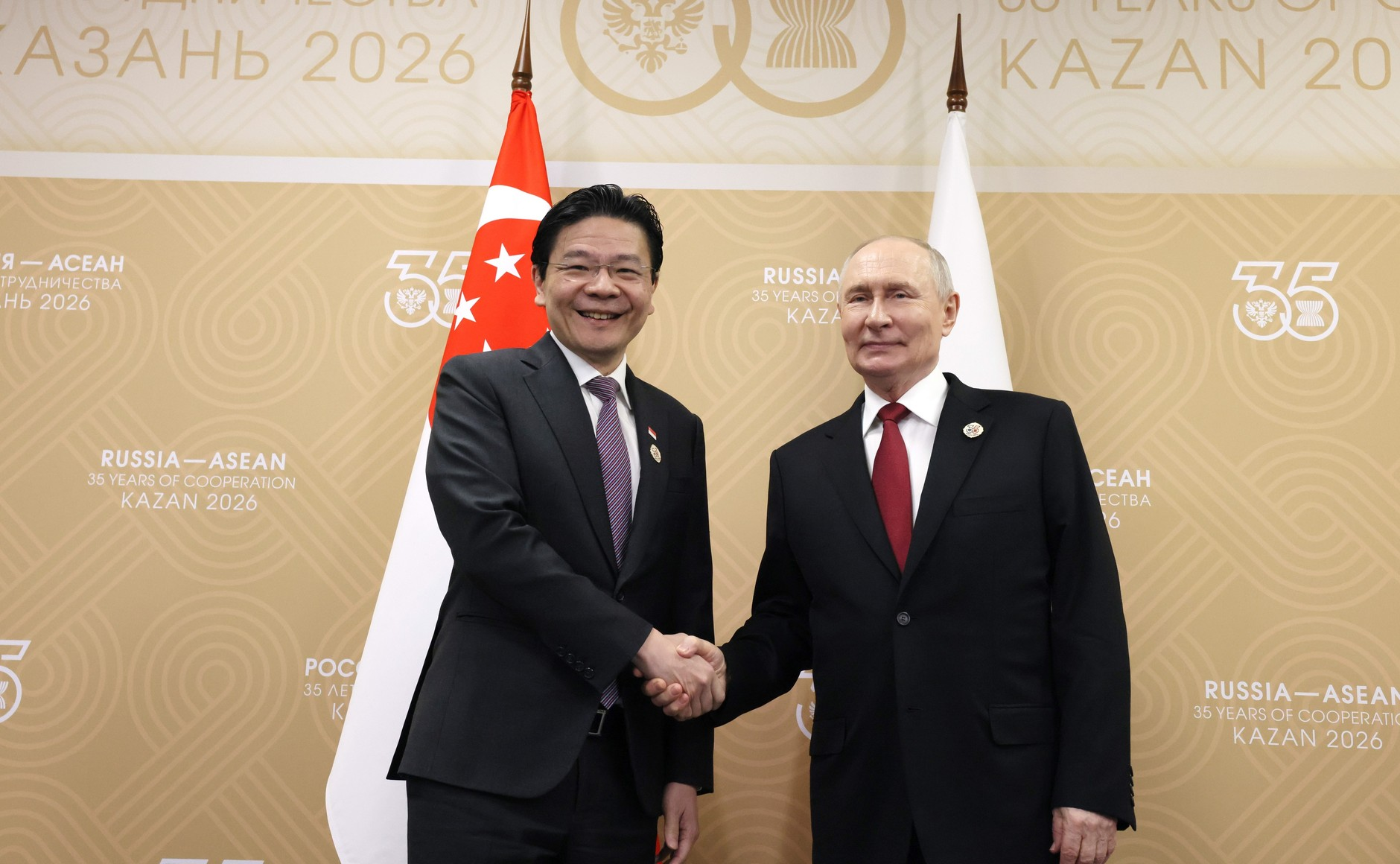
Singaporean Prime Minister Lawrence Wong meeting Russian President Vladimir Putin at the Russia–ASEAN Summit in Kazan, June 2026

Singapore's leaders are realists; they perceive a Hobbesian world where might makes right. Even so, there are shades of liberalism and constructivist thought in its foreign policy as evinced by the belief that economic interdependence will lessen the chances of conflict and that Singapore cannot be fatalistic as a small country. The resultant siege mentality is due to Singapore's geographical weaknesses, mistrust of Malaysia and Indonesia due to historical baggage, and from how it stands out as a "little red dot in a sea of green", as then-President Habibie of Indonesia put it.

Singapore's first foreign minister was S. Rajaratnam, and the country's foreign policy still bears his imprimatur. Rajaratnam originally framed Singapore's foreign policy, taking into account "the jungle of international politics", and was wary of foreign policy "on the basis of permanent enemies." In 1966, S. Rajaratnam saw Singapore's challenge as ensuring its sustained survival, peace, and prosperity in a region suffering from mutual jealousies, internal violence, economic disintegration and great power conflicts.

In accordance with this worldview, Singapore's foreign policy is aimed at maintaining friendly relations with all countries, especially Malaysia, Indonesia, and ASEAN, and ensuring that its actions do not exacerbate its neighbours' insecurities. In 1972, Rajaratnam envisioned the world being Singapore's hinterland – integration into the world economy would ameliorate Singapore's inherent lack of natural resources. Thus, Rajaratnam believed that maintaining a balance of power, rather than becoming a de facto vassal of some larger power, would provide Singapore with freedom to pursue an independent foreign policy. The cultivation of the great powers' interest in Singapore also would effectively function to deter the interference of regional powers.

== Trade agreements ==
Economy	Agreement	Abbreviation	Concluded	Signed	Effective	Legal text
New Zealand	Agreement between New Zealand and Singapore on a Closer Economic Partnership	ANZSCEP	18 August 2000	14 November 2000	1 January 2001	
European Free Trade Association	Agreement between the EFTA States and Singapore	EFTA-Singapore FTA	11 April 2002	26 June 2002	1 January 2003	
Japan	Agreement between Japan and the Republic of Singapore for a New-Age Economic Partnership	JSEPA	October 2001	13 January 2002		
United States	United States-Singapore Free Trade Agreement	USSFTA	19 November 2002	6 May 2003	1 January 2004	
Jordan	Singapore Jordan Free Trade Agreement	SJFTA	29 April 2004	16 May 2004		
Brunei	Trans-Pacific Strategic Economic Partnership Agreement	Trans-Pacific SEP		August 2005	1 January 2006	
Chile	Trans-Pacific Strategic Economic Partnership Agreement	Trans-Pacific SEP		18 July 2005	1 January 2006	
New Zealand	Trans-Pacific Strategic Economic Partnership Agreement	Trans-Pacific SEP		18 July 2005	1 January 2006	
India	India - Singapore Comprehensive Economic Cooperation Agreement	India-Singapore CECA	November 2004	29 June 2005	1 August 2005	
Korea	Korea-Singapore Free Trade Agreement	KSFTA	28 November 2004	4 August 2005	End 2005	
Peru	Peru-Singapore Free Trade Agreement	PesFTA	September 2007	29 May 2008	Early 2009	

== International organizations ==
=== APEC ===
The Asia-Pacific Economic Cooperation (APEC) is based in Singapore, of which Singapore is a founding member of. Singapore has long recognised the importance of APEC as an essential platform for promoting economic linkages and its benefits towards strengthening regional peace and security between member economies. Singapore has endorsed APEC's efforts at regional economic integration as well as its non-trade agendas of human resource development, emergency preparedness and health. Singapore has since hosted the APEC forum in 2009.

=== INTERPOL ===
The International Criminal Police Organization INTERPOL has opened its Global Complex for Innovation, or IGCI, in Singapore in 2015. As of 2016, the IGCI houses a global Command and Coordination Centre, the Organization's Capacity Building and Training Directorate, an Innovation Centre annex Cyber Research Lab, and the Cybercrime Directorate, which also incorporates the building's Cyber Fusion Centre. The building is also used for large-scale projects and operations with a global impact, law enforcement trainings and cross-sector conferences with a nexus in the ASEAN region.

=== G20 ===
Singapore, although not a G20 member, has been invited to participate in G20 summits and its related processes in 2010, 2011 and from 2013 to 2017 as a representative of the Global Governance Group. In February 2017, Minister for Foreign Affairs Dr Vivian Balakrishnan attended the G20 Foreign Ministers Meeting in Bonn.

== Diplomatic relations ==
List of countries which Singapore maintains diplomatic relations with:

#	Country	Date
1	United Kingdom	9 August 1965
2	Australia	18 August 1965
3	India	24 August 1965
4	Malaysia	1 September 1965
5	Cambodia	15 September 1965
6	France	18 September 1965
7	Thailand	20 September 1965
8	Denmark	28 September 1965
9	Italy	28 October 1965
10	Germany	6 November 1965
11	New Zealand	22 November 1965
12	Netherlands	7 December 1965
13	Canada	15 December 1965
14	Sweden	8 February 1966
15	Austria	16 March 1966
16	United States	4 April 1966
17	Myanmar	12 April 1966
18	Japan	26 April 1966
19	Pakistan	17 August 1966
20	Belgium	10 October 1966
21	Greece	21 October 1966
22	Egypt	28 November 1966
23	Romania	30 May 1967
24	Serbia	22 August 1967
25	Indonesia	7 September 1967
26	Switzerland	11 October 1967
27	Brazil	2 November 1967
28	Bulgaria	20 November 1967
29	Russia	1 June 1968
30	Spain	15 June 1968
31	Turkey	12 February 1969
32	Norway	7 March 1969
33	Nepal	25 March 1969
34	Ethiopia	31 March 1969
35	Poland	10 April 1969
36	Lebanon	3 May 1969
37	Israel	11 May 1969
38	Philippines	16 May 1969
39	Nigeria	20 April 1970
40	Mongolia	11 June 1970
41	Sri Lanka	27 July 1970
42	Hungary	24 August 1970
43	Fiji	30 November 1971
44	Trinidad and Tobago	15 December 1971
45	Bangladesh	10 September 1972
46	Finland	16 February 1973
47	Vietnam	1 August 1973
48	Iran	6 August 1973
49	Czech Republic	23 November 1973
50	El Salvador	6 August 1974
51	Argentina	30 September 1974
52	Ireland	2 December 1974
53	Laos	2 December 1974
54	Maldives	20 February 1975
55	Luxembourg	17 March 1975
56	South Korea	8 August 1975
57	North Korea	8 November 1975
58	Mexico	22 December 1975
59	Papua New Guinea	14 May 1976
60	Saudi Arabia	10 November 1977
61	Iraq	27 December 1977
62	Chile	25 July 1979
63	Cyprus	26 April 1980
64	Peru	27 October 1980
65	Tanzania	12 December 1980
66	Portugal	7 January 1981
—	Holy See	23 June 1981
67	Panama	6 August 1982
68	Vanuatu	10 December 1982
69	Colombia	15 December 1982
70	Somalia	14 January 1983
71	Yemen	8 March 1983
72	Algeria	12 May 1983
73	Djibouti	15 September 1983
74	Brunei	1 January 1984
75	Democratic Republic of the Congo	23 March 1984
76	Qatar	24 November 1984
77	Tunisia	30 November 1984
78	Oman	21 February 1985
79	United Arab Emirates	15 May 1985
80	Bahrain	30 June 1985
81	Honduras	5 July 1985
82	Kuwait	18 November 1985
83	Albania	20 November 1986
84	Liberia	7 January 1987
85	Solomon Islands	21 April 1987
86	Zimbabwe	31 July 1987
87	Venezuela	1 August 1987
88	Bolivia	3 August 1987
89	Costa Rica	1 September 1987
90	Uruguay	15 September 1987
91	Malta	16 May 1988
92	Jordan	28 July 1988
93	Seychelles	16 September 1988
94	Mali	29 August 1989
95	Kiribati	7 September 1989
96	Ghana	11 October 1989
97	Mauritius	27 October 1989
98	Lesotho	12 January 1990
99	Madagascar	31 January 1990
100	Samoa	3 September 1990
101	China	3 October 1990
102	Federated States of Micronesia	26 August 1991
103	Cameroon	30 September 1991
104	Kenya	30 September 1991
105	Moldova	15 January 1992
106	Latvia	20 January 1992
107	Ukraine	31 March 1992
108	Armenia	1 July 1992
109	Saint Kitts and Nevis	1 July 1992
110	Belarus	12 August 1992
111	Kyrgyzstan	27 August 1992
112	Marshall Islands	28 August 1992
113	Eswatini	1 September 1992
114	Slovenia	7 September 1992
115	Jamaica	1 November 1992
116	Croatia	23 November 1992
117	Guatemala	1 December 1992
118	Paraguay	10 December 1992
119	Nicaragua	6 January 1993
120	Estonia	2 February 1993
121	Slovakia	11 February 1993
122	Georgia	16 February 1993
123	Kazakhstan	30 March 1993
124	Burkina Faso	1 May 1993
125	Tonga	6 August 1993
126	Botswana	30 August 1993
127	Lithuania	10 October 1993
128	South Africa	11 October 1993
129	Eritrea	15 December 1993
130	Saint Lucia	15 January 1994
131	Benin	21 February 1994
132	Azerbaijan	15 August 1994
133	Ecuador	23 September 1994
134	Namibia	9 November 1994
135	North Macedonia	8 May 1995
136	Belize	23 August 1995
137	Cape Verde	6 October 1995
138	Bosnia and Herzegovina	1 November 1995
139	Tajikistan	8 December 1995
140	Suriname	15 April 1996
141	Guinea-Bissau	1 July 1996
142	Mozambique	29 July 1996
143	Turkmenistan	12 September 1996
144	Ivory Coast	2 October 1996
145	Zambia	17 December 1996
146	Barbados	19 December 1996
147	Morocco	20 January 1997
148	Uzbekistan	8 April 1997
149	Cuba	18 April 1997
150	São Tomé and Príncipe	18 August 1997
151	Andorra	18 September 1997
152	Niger	1 June 1998
153	Uganda	1 June 1998
154	Malawi	24 August 1998
155	Iceland	4 May 1999
156	Saint Vincent and the Grenadines	19 February 1999
157	Senegal	16 June 1999
158	Palau	30 September 1999
159	Dominican Republic	10 February 2000
160	Angola	14 September 2000
161	Grenada	15 December 2000
162	Republic of the Congo	8 February 2001
163	Haiti	16 February 2001
164	Tuvalu	8 December 2001
165	Timor-Leste	20 May 2002
166	Guyana	19 September 2002
167	Bhutan	20 September 2002
168	Sudan	8 October 2003
169	Bahamas	16 December 2004
170	Rwanda	18 March 2005
171	San Marino	9 December 2005
172	Libya	3 March 2006
173	Afghanistan	22 June 2006
174	Montenegro	30 September 2006
175	Antigua and Barbuda	12 December 2006
176	Gabon	6 February 2007
177	Syria	28 May 2008
178	Nauru	12 March 2009
179	Liechtenstein	19 April 2010
180	Dominica	6 June 2012
181	Togo	15 June 2012
—	Cook Islands	6 August 2012
—	Niue	6 August 2012
182	Comoros	8 April 2013
183	Sierra Leone	9 April 2013
184	Gambia	23 January 2015
185	Guinea	24 February 2016
—	Kosovo	1 December 2016
186	Mauritania	22 February 2018
187	Equatorial Guinea	11 April 2018
188	Chad	25 September 2018
189	Burundi	6 October 2023
190	Monaco	23 September 2025
191	South Sudan	27 August 2026

== Bilateral relations ==
=== Africa ===
Country	Formal Relations Began	Notes
Djibouti	September 1983	Both countries established diplomatic relations in September 1983. Prime Minister Lee met President Ismail on 28 April 2019.
Egypt	28 November 1966	Singapore maintains an embassy in Cairo.; Egypt has an embassy in Singapore.; There are also hundreds of Singaporean students studying in Egyptian Islamic seminaries.
Ethiopia	31 March 1969	Prime Minister Wong met Prime Minister Abiy Ahmed Ali on 24 November 2024.; An embassy in Addis Abba is scheduled to be set up by 2027
Kenya		See Kenya–Singapore relations: Kenya is accredited to Singapore from its High Commission in New Delhi, India.; Singapore has a non-resident ambassador based in Singapore accredited to Kenya.
Mauritania	22 February 2018	Both countries established diplomatic relations on 22 February 2018.; Mauritania is represented in Singapore by its embassy in Tokyo, Japan.
Nigeria		Nigeria has a High Commission in Singapore.; Singapore has a non-resident ambassador based in Singapore accredited to Nigeria and has an honorary consulate-general in Lagos.
South Africa	11 October 1993	See Singapore–South Africa relations: Singapore maintains a High Commission in Pretoria.; South Africa has a High Commission in Singapore.

=== Americas ===
Country	Formal Relations Began	Notes
Argentina		Argentina has an embassy in Singapore.; Singapore has a non-resident ambassador based in Singapore accredited to Argentina.
Barbados	19 December 1996	Both countries established diplomatic relations on 19 December 1996. On 17 July 2013 a bilateral Open Skies Agreement (OSA) were signed between both countries. On 25 April 2014 a bilateral Singapore-Barbados Double Taxation Agreement treaty came into effect with subsequent modifications in 2021.
Brazil		See Brazil–Singapore relations: Brazil has an embassy in Singapore.; Singapore has an embassy in Brasília.
Canada		See Canada–Singapore relations: Canada has a High Commission in Singapore.; Singapore is accredited to Canada from its non-resident High Commissioner based in Singapore and by an Honorary Consulate-General in Vancouver and Toronto.; These ties are enhanced by the many Canadians who reside in Singapore, and the 83,000 Canadians that visit the city-state every year.
Chile		Chile has an embassy in Singapore.; Singapore has a non-resident ambassador based in Singapore accredited to Chile and has an honorary consulate-general in Santiago.
Cuba		Cuba has an embassy in Singapore.; Singapore has a non-resident ambassador based in Singapore accredited to Cuba.
Mexico	22 December 1975	See Mexico–Singapore relations: Mexico has an embassy in Singapore.; Singapore has an embassy in Mexico City.
Peru		Peru has an embassy in Singapore.; Singapore has a non-resident ambassador based in Singapore accredited to Peru and has an honorary consulate-general in Lima.
Trinidad and Tobago		See Singapore-Trinidad and Tobago relations: Singapore established diplomatic relations with Trinidad and Tobago in 1971; Singapore was the 3rd largest import partner of Trinidad and Tobago in 2015; Trinidad has a High Commission in New Delhi to deal with diplomatic relations with Singapore
United States		See Singapore–United States relations Singapore and the United States share a long-standing and strong relationship, particularly in defence, the economy, health and education. The government of Singapore believes that regional security, and by extension, Singapore's security will be affected if the United States loses its resolve in Iraq. Defence Relations Singapore and the US have strong defence relations; Singapore buys a large number of weapon systems from the US, and has close ties such as the F-16 detachment stationed at Luke Air Force Base. In return, the United States Navy is allowed to use Singaporean naval facilities, including the newly constructed Changi Naval Base designed with USN aircraft carriers in mind. Under a Memorandum of Understanding signed in 1990, the United States military is permitted to use Paya Lebar Airbase and Sembawang wharves; a US naval logistic unit was established in Singapore in 1992. Singapore routinely hosts American ships and American fighter aircraft. More than 100 American Navy warships call at Singapore annually, and there is a modest presence of less than 200 US military personnel based permanently in Singapore. Several naval bases in Singapore were built to US specifications, so as to allow American ships, especially carriers, to dock. In 2011, the US Navy announced plans to station several of its new Littoral combat ships in Singapore permanently. Singapore also signed 'The Strategic Framework Agreement for a Closer Cooperation Partnership in Defence and Security' with the United States in 2005. The agreement gives a formal structure to addressing existing and future areas of bilateral security and defence cooperation. The Singapore government believes that regional security, and by extension Singapore's security, will be affected if the United States loses its resolve in Iraq. Singapore faces the threat of terrorism itself, as evidenced by the Singapore embassies attack plot. Singapore has pushed regional counter-terrorism initiatives, with a strong resolve to deal with terrorists inside its borders. To this end it has given support to the US-led coalition to fight terrorism, with bilateral cooperation in counter-terrorism and counter-proliferation initiatives, and joint military exercises. Relations with the United States have expanded in other areas, and the two countries take part in joint policy dialogues. The Regional Emerging Diseases Intervention Centre (REDI), opened on 24 May 2004, is a joint US-Singapore collaboration to promote cooperation in tackling emerging infectious diseases. The centre facilitates the exchange of information and expertise on surveillance; prevention and control of, and research on, communicable and non-communicable diseases; and on bioterrorism concerns. In July 2005, during his official visit to the United States, Prime Minister Lee Hsien Loong and President George W. Bush signed a Strategic Framework Agreement (SFA) to strengthen defence and security cooperation. The Prime Minister again visited in the United States in May 2007. Trade In 2003, Singapore and the United States signed the United States-Singapore Free Trade Agreement (USSFTA), which came into force in January 2004. This is the first free trade agreement into which U.S. entered with an East Asian country. Others In 1994, relations with the U.S. were hampered for a brief period by the caning incident of American teenager Michael P. Fay who was convicted in Singapore for vandalism. In September 2005, Singapore responded to the relief effort in the wake of Hurricane Katrina in the United States. Four Singaporean CH-47 Chinook helicopters and 45 RSAF personnel from a training detachment based in Grand Prairie, Texas, were sent to help in relief operations. They are operating out of Fort Polk in cooperation with the Texas Army National Guard.

=== Asia ===
Country	Formal Relations Began	Notes
Armenia	1 July 1992	See Armenia–Singapore relations Both countries established diplomatic relations on 1 July 1992.
Azerbaijan	15 August 1994	See Azerbaijan–Singapore relations Both countries established diplomatic relations on 15 August 1994.
Bangladesh		See Bangladesh–Singapore relations: Bangladesh has a High Commission in Singapore.; Singapore has a consulate in Dhaka.
Brunei		See Brunei–Singapore relations Brunei and Singapore have a currency agreement that the currencies of both countries can be used in either of the two countries. The Brunei dollar and the Singapore dollar are maintained at parity. In August 2005, Brunei's Foreign Affairs and Trade Minister, Prince Mohamed Bolkiah arrived in Singapore for a three-day visit during which the two countries signed an agreement to eliminate double taxation, paving the way for further bilateral trade and investment. The Royal Brunei Navy and the Republic of Singapore Navy conduct an annual Exercise Pelican signifying strong ties between the two navies.
Cambodia		See Cambodia–Singapore relations: Cambodia has an embassy in Singapore.; Singapore has an embassy in Phnom Penh.
China		See China–Singapore relations Sino-Singaporean ties began much earlier than the founding of the People's Republic of China in October 1949. Migrant Chinese labourers escaping poverty and war came to what was known as Nanyang to the Chinese to Singapore which was part of British Malaya. Many ethnic Chinese Singaporeans derived their ancestral roots in southern China from Fujian, Guangdong and Hainan provinces. Diplomatic ties between the two countries officially began on 3 October 1990. Singapore was the last country in South East Asia to formally recognise People's Republic of China out of respect to Indonesia, sensitivities in the region and fears from neighbouring countries of communism in those times. Singapore still maintains cooperation with ROC in terms of military training and facilities from an agreement in 1975. This is due to a lack of usable space in built-up Singapore. Hence China has offered Singapore to relocate some of its training facilities from Taiwan to Hainan province. Bilateral ties took a dive when Singapore's deputy Prime Minister Lee Hsien Loong travelled to Taiwan for a private visit in 2004. Later in 2004, Chinese government put bilateral relations on hold. On 19 September 2005, Vice Premier Wu Yi of the People's Republic of China arrived in Singapore for a three-day visit. She led a delegation of ministers and senior officials at the 2nd Joint Council for Bilateral Cooperation between the PRC and Singapore. On 14 November 2010, Vice President Xi Jinping visited Singapore on a three-day visit to further develop bilateral ties. His visit also commemorated the 20th anniversary of diplomatic relations between the two countries. Singapore is China's 9th largest trading partner. While China is Singapore's 3rd largest trading partner which consisted of 10.1 percent of Singapore's total external trade from the previous year. Other examples of close ties between Singapore and China include Singapore helping China to build up its industries such as the Suzhou Industrial Park. Singaporeans have also donated generously in the aftermath of the 2008 Sichuan earthquake. Since 17 April 2011 Chinese and Singaporean diplomatic, official and official ordinary passport holders able to enjoy 30-day transit visa-free service for entering each other's country. In September 2012, the first China-Singapore Social Management Senior Forum was held in Singapore, and the two sides signed an exchange of notes on strengthening social management cooperation. In April 2013, Emeritus Senior Minister Goh Chok Tong attended the annual meeting of the Boao Forum for Asia and visited Guangdong. In March 2013, the People's Bank of China and the Monetary Authority of Singapore renewed the bilateral local currency swap agreement between China and Singapore, and the swap scale was expanded to 300 billion yuan/60 billion Singapore dollars.
East Timor	20 May 2002	Both countries established diplomatic relations on 20 May 2002.; East Timor has an embassy in Singapore.; Singapore is accredited to East Timor from its embassy in Jakarta, Indonesia.
India		See India-Singapore relations Singapore Navy frigate RSS Formidable (68) steams alongside the Indian Navy frigate INS Brahmaputra (F 31) in the Bay of Bengal. Singapore is one of India's strongest allies in South East Asia. India and Singapore share long-standing cultural ties with more than 300,000 people of Indian origin living in Singapore. Singapore was one of the first to respond to India's "Look East" Policy of expanding its economic, cultural and strategic ties in Southeast Asia to strengthen its standing as a regional power. Singapore, and especially, the Singaporean Foreign Minister, George Yeo, have taken an interest in establishing the Nalanda University. ==== Strategic Relations ==== Following its independence in 1965, Singapore was concerned with PRC-backed threats as well as domination from Malaysia and Indonesia and sought a close strategic relationship with India, which it saw as a counterbalance to PRC influence and a partner in achieving regional security. Singapore had always been an important strategic trading post, giving India trade access to Maritime Southeast Asia and the Far East. Although the rival positions of both nations over the Vietnam War and the Cold War caused consternation between India and Singapore, their relationship expanded significantly in the 1990s; Singapore was one of the first to respond to India's "Look East" Policy of expanding its economic, cultural and strategic ties in Southeast Asia to strengthen its standing as a regional power. ==== Economic and other ties ==== Singapore is the 8th largest source of investment in India and the largest amongst ASEAN member nations. It is also India's 9th biggest trading partner as of 2005–06. Its cumulative investment in India totals US$3 billion as of 2006 and is expected to rise to US 5 billion by 2010 and US 10 billion by 2015. India's economic liberalisation and its "Look East" policy have led to a major expansion in bilateral trade, which grew from US$2.2 billion in 2001 to US 9–10 billion in 2006 – a 400% growth in span of five years – and to US$50 billion by 2010. Singapore accounts for 38% of India's trade with ASEAN member nations and 3.4% of its total foreign trade. India's main exports to Singapore in 2005 included petroleum, gemstones, jewellery, machinery and its imports from Singapore included electronic goods, organic chemicals and metals. More than half of Singapore's exports to India are basically "re-exports" – items that had been imported from India.
Indonesia		See Indonesia–Singapore relations In August 2005, Singapore and Indonesia signed a Memorandum of Understanding to expand aviation rights between the two countries. On 3 October 2005, Prime Minister Lee Hsien Loong met Indonesian President Susilo Bambang Yudhoyono in Bali, just two days after the Bali bombings. They agreed to strengthen the fight against terrorism and also discussed cooperation in the fields of economy, trade and investment. Relations with Indonesia are generally good, though current outstanding issues include the bans on the export of sand, and granite; both of which Singapore's construction industry is reliant on.
Iraq	27 December 1977	Singapore does not have any diplomatic missions in Iraq.; Iraq is accredited to Singapore via its embassy in Jakarta, Indonesia.
Israel	11 May 1969	See Israel–Singapore relations Singapore and Israel enjoy very close bilateral relations. In 1965, Israel extended aid to newly independent Singapore by sending a mission to help build Singapore's economic and defense policy. Israel's representation in Singapore was first formalized in 1968, and relations have since expanded, building strong economic ties and signing bilateral agreements, particularly in areas such as business, technology, healthcare, and defense. Singapore and Israel also hold regular cultural exchanges, through the participation of Israeli arts and artists in Singapore's events, such as the Israeli Film Festival. Despite the close relations, Israel's airline El Al does not fly to Singapore as such a route would have to pass through the airspace of Indonesia and Malaysia, neither of which have diplomatic relations with Israel.: Singapore maintains an honorary consulate in Tel Aviv.; Israel has an embassy in Singapore.
Japan		See Japan–Singapore relations.: Japan has an embassy in Singapore.; Singapore has an embassy in Tokyo.
Laos		Laos has an embassy in Singapore.; Singapore has an embassy in Vientiane.
Malaysia		See Malaysia–Singapore relations Singapore was formerly part of Malaysia but separated in 1965 due to political differences and racial tension. There remains a high degree of economic and social inter-dependence between the two countries. For example, Singapore imports the vast majority of fresh meat and vegetables from Malaysia, and Malaysia supplies a large fraction of Singapore's fresh water according to two treaties. Many Malaysians work in Singapore, some living in Singapore as permanent residents, while many also commute from Johor Bahru daily. Bilateral relations are complex and have experienced many highs and lows over the last 40 years. ==== Defence ==== Singapore and Malaysia are both members of the Five Power Defence Arrangements. The two countries also routinely conduct joint military exercises to enhance bilateral ties and to heighten the professional interaction between the Singapore Armed Forces and Malaysian Armed Forces. In August 2005, the two countries concluded the 12th exercise of the series, Ex Semangat Bersatu 05 in Pahang. ==== Disputes ==== Singapore has several long-standing disputes with Malaysia over a number of issues. Malaysia and Singapore have clashed over the delivery of fresh water to Singapore, with Malaysia threatening to stop providing water and Singapore threatening to stop relying on Malaysia for water. Others include: Maritime boundaries; Moving of the Singapore station of Malaysia's Keretapi Tanah Melayu from Tanjong Pagar to Bukit Timah. See Malaysia-Singapore Points of Agreement of 1990 and moving Malaysia's immigration checkpoint from the railway station to the Causeway. This is resolved on 24 May 2010 when Malaysian PM Najib Razak agreed to shift the station and immigration checkpoint from Tanjong Pagar to Woodlands.; Withdrawal of Central Provident Fund funds by West Malaysians.; ==== Improved relationship ==== Relations between the two countries has improved in recent years, especially since the transition of leadership in both governments. These relations improved by leaps and bounds when Abdullah Ahmad Badawi took over the post as prime minister. Mahathir Mohamad, the ex-Prime Minister, still raises claims regarding Singapore's intentions in a number of matters, such as land reclamation. On 26 April 2005, the two countries signed a settlement agreement concerning Singapore's land reclamation in and around the Straits of Johor. Both countries exchanged many high-level visits in 2004 and 2005, including the visit to Singapore on 12 January 2004 by Malaysian Prime Minister Abdullah Ahmad Badawi who had just taken over from Mahathir in October 2003.
Mongolia	15 October 1987	See Mongolia–Singapore relations: Singapore has a non-resident ambassador to Mongolia, based in Seoul.; Mongolia has an embassy in Singapore.
Myanmar	12 April 1966	See Myanmar–Singapore relations Myanmar has an embassy in Singapore. Singapore has an embassy in Yangon. Singapore is one of Myanmar's top investors and trading partners. In the past, Singapore faced scrutiny from Burmese democracy activists, exacerbated by Lee Kuan Yew's comments in 1996. After the 2021 Myanmar coup, Singapore adopted stronger stances against the military regime and pressuring the regime to cooperate with ASEAN's peace plan. However, Singapore continues to be a major source of equipment for the junta's weapons factories.
North Korea	8 November 1975	See North Korea–Singapore relations Singapore and North Korea established diplomatic relations on 8 November 1975. North Korea maintains an embassy in Singapore while the latter has accredited a non-resident ambassador to Pyongyang from Beijing since 1990. The current North Korea ambassador to Singapore is Jong Song Il.
Pakistan		See Pakistan–Singapore relations: Pakistan has a High Commission in Singapore.; Singapore has a consulate in Islamabad.
Philippines		See Philippines–Singapore relations: Philippines has an embassy in Singapore.; Singapore has an embassy in Manila.
Saudi Arabia		See Saudi Arabia–Singapore relations: Saudi Arabia has an embassy in Singapore.; Singapore has an embassy in Riyadh and a consulate-general in Jeddah.
South Korea	8 August 1975	See Singapore–South Korea relations The establishment of diplomatic relations between the Republic of Singapore and the Republic of Korea began on 8 August 1975.: Singapore has an embassy in Seoul.; South Korea has an embassy in Singapore.
Taiwan		See Singapore–Taiwan relations During British rule in Singapore and then under British Malaya before independence, Singapore and the Republic of China had diplomatic relations. When Singapore became independent in 1965 from Malaysia, it continued to recognise the Republic of China on Taiwan. When Singapore established diplomatic relations with the People's Republic of China in 1990, Singapore wanted to maintain its good relationship with Taiwan and it strongly bargained with the PRC to maintain close relations with Taiwan. Both countries have had unofficial relations since the independence of Singapore and establishment of Republic of China rule over the island of Taiwan. Taiwan has a representative office in Singapore. Conversely, Singapore is represented by what is known as the Singapore Trade Office in Taipei in Taiwan. The two nations have enjoyed an extensive relationship in many facets such as trade and defence, most noticeably being Singapore's establishment of military bases in Taiwan for its troops to conduct overseas training. Like Thailand where Singapore today adopted modern military training bases with, Taiwan was also under Japanese Greater East Asia Co-Prosperity Sphere influence leading up to post-World War II. Strategically, the Japanese occupation of Singapore and the Japanese occupation of Malaya was made possible and expedited because of Thai and Taiwanese varied involvements and / or assistances towards the Japanese war efforts. Since the independence of Singapore and the establishment of Kuomintang rule over the island of Taiwan, the Singapore Armed Forces (SAF) adopted military training bases in Taiwan from 1975 that included combined arms exercises involving infantry, artillery, and armored units. The then prime minister of Singapore Lee Kuan Yew also appointed Taiwanese military personnel in training Republic of Singapore Air Force. These exercises, engaging as many as 10,000 troops at one time, provided officers a chance to simulate wartime conditions more closely and gain experience in the command and control of operations involving several battalions. With waning Taiwan diplomatic significance, the People's Republic of China has since succeeded the governance of mainland China in the aftermath of the Chinese Civil War. Attempts by the 2016 newly elected Taiwanese government in turning to South East Asian nations such as Singapore is subtly deemed as separatist. ==== Agreements ==== In 2010, bilateral trade talks commenced to explore the feasibility of an economic cooperation agreement between the Separate Customs Territory of Taiwan, Penghu, Kinmen and Matsu (Republic of China) and Singapore, both of whom are members of the World Trade Organization (WTO). On 12 September 2012, former Taiwanese Vice-President Lien Chan announced that talks between Taiwan and Singapore on a proposed economic partnership agreement are expected to be finalised by the end of the year. The successful implementation of this economic partnership would mean that both countries will enjoy free trade between one another. ==== Cooperation ==== ===== Business and trade ===== The Taipei Representative Office in Singapore has been actively promoting trade as well as encouraging mutual start-ups by businesses and enterprises between the two countries. Moreover, in 2009, the Singapore Trade Office in Taipei was honoured for its role in developing close economic ties between the two sides. Taiwan is Singapore's ninth largest trading partner, with bilateral trade topping S$35 billion in 2008. ===== Military ===== When Singapore started building up its military soon after independence, the Republic of China (Taiwan) was one of the few places to offer assistance by providing training areas to the Singapore Armed Forces (SAF) to conduct military exercises. This was crucial to Singapore as it was a small country which suffered from land-scarcity making it difficult to conduct large-scale military exercises for its soldiers. Since 1975, the Singapore Army has used bases in Taiwan for military training that included combined arms exercises involving infantry, artillery, and armoured units. These exercises, engaging as many as 10,000 troops at one time, provided officers a chance to simulate wartime conditions more closely and gain experience in the command and control of operations involving several battalions. Although China has officially offered Singapore to shift its training facilities to Hainan Island, this has been refused in order to maintain its policy of neutrality between the 'One China' policy and its relations with Taiwan. It also signals that Taiwan-Singapore ties are strong. ==== Controversies ==== Just before Singaporean prime minister Lee Hsien Loong took office from the then incumbent Goh Chok Tong, he made a visit to Taiwan to familiarise himself with the latest developments there. The Taiwanese media, however, made use of this opportunity to publicise his visit with the agenda of highlighting it to Mainland China. Controversy struck swiftly, with PRC Foreign Ministry spokesperson Zhang Qiyue accusing Lee of "hurting the feelings of 1.3 billion Chinese". Meetings and business transactions between Singapore and the PRC were reportedly frozen overnight. As a result, in his maiden National Day Rally speech, Lee criticised the Taiwanese leadership and populace of overestimating the support they would receive if they were to declare Taiwan independence. Later that year in September, Singapore Foreign Minister George Yeo cautioned the United Nations General Assembly about the dangers of letting the cross-strait relationship deteriorate. This led to Taiwan's foreign minister, Mark Chen, to famously describe Singapore as a 'nation no bigger than a piece of snot' (鼻屎大ㄟ國家) in Chinese. Supporters of Taiwanese independence also burnt the flag of Singapore as a sign of protest against George Yeo's comments at the United Nations. This did not go down well with the majority of the Singaporean public. These incidents marked an all-time low in foreign relations between the two sides although Chen did make a formal apology later regarding his comments. ==== Issue of Taiwanese independence ==== On 3 October 1990, the People's Republic of China (PRC) and Singapore established formal diplomatic relations. Relationship between the two sides has since improved tremendously. . Even so, Singapore has always wanted to maintain its warm ties with Taiwan in order to show its neutrality on cross-strait relations. Although it officially supports the 'One China' policy, Singapore is the only foreign country to currently own military bases in Taiwan and it continues to send its troops there for an annual military exercise known as Exercise Starlight (星光計畫). The PRC has continuously advocated the possibility of moving some or all of these military facilities to Hainan, although this may not be taken up due to sensitivities in diplomatic relations between Singapore and her largely Islamic neighbours.
Thailand		See Singapore–Thailand relations: Singapore has an embassy in Bangkok.; Thailand has an embassy in Singapore.
Turkey	12 Feb 1969	See Singapore–Turkey relations: Singapore has an embassy in Ankara.; Turkey has an embassy in Singapore.; Trade volume between the two countries was US$808 million in 2015 (Singaporean exports/imports: 365/443 million USD).; There are direct flights from Istanbul to Singapore.
United Arab Emirates		Singapore has an embassy in Abu Dhabi and a consulate-general in Dubai.; UAE has an embassy in Singapore.
Vietnam		See Singapore–Vietnam relations: Singapore has an embassy in Hanoi and a consulate-general in Ho Chi Minh City.; Vietnam has an embassy in Singapore.

ce

=== Europe ===
Country	Formal relations began	Notes
Austria		Austria has an embassy in Singapore.; Singapore maintains an embassy in Vienna.
Belgium	10 October 1966	Belgium has an embassy in Singapore.; Singapore maintains an embassy in Brussels.
Czech Republic	February 1993	Czech Republic has an embassy in Singapore.; Singapore has a non-resident ambassador based in Singapore accredited to the Czech Republic and has an honorary consulates-general in Prague.; Singaporean President Ong Teng Cheong visited the Czech Republic in 1998.
Denmark	28 September 1965	Denmark has an embassy in United Square in Singapore.; Singapore has an honorary consulate in Copenhagen.
France	18 September 1965	See France–Singapore relations: Singapore maintains an embassy in Paris.; France has an embassy in Singapore.; Singapore and France maintain relatively strong relations. This was strengthened in March 1999 on the agreement of a "Joint declaration for a strengthened partnership" during Prime Minister Goh Chok Tong's visit to France.
Germany	6 November 1965	See Germany–Singapore relations: Singapore maintains an embassy in Berlin.; Germany has an embassy in Singapore at the Singapore Land Tower.
Greece	21 October 1966	Singapore has an honorary consulate in Athens.; Greece has an honorary consulate in Singapore located at the Sime Darby Centre. The embassy of Greece in Jakarta, Indonesia is accredited to Singapore.
Holy See	23 June 1981	The Apostolic Nunciature of the Holy See is resident in Singapore while the embassy of Singapore in Brussels is accredited to the Holy See. Pope John Paul II made an official visit to Singapore back in 1986 and Pope Francis also made an official visit to Singapore in 2024.
Hungary	24 August 1970	In July 2005, the prime minister of the Republic of Hungary, Ferenc Gyurcsány made an official visit to Singapore.: Hungary has an embassy on the 29th floor of the Raffles City Tower in Singapore.; Singapore maintains an honorary consulate in Budapest.
Iceland	4 May 1999	Both countries established diplomatic relations on 4 May 1999.
Italy		Although Italy and Singapore maintain diplomatic relations, Singapore does not have an embassy in Rome. During a visit to Rome in 2007, Minister Mentor Lee Kuan Yew stated that opening an embassy could be a challenge because trade and people flow between Italy and Singapore has yet to reach a significant level.: Italy has an embassy in the United Square in Singapore.; Singapore has an honorary consulate in Rome.
Kosovo	1 December 2016	See Kosovo–Singapore relations: Singapore recognised the Republic of Kosovo as an independent state on 1 December 2016.; Both countries established diplomatic relations on 1 December 2016.
Netherlands	1965	See Netherlands–Singapore relations Upon Singapore's declaration of independence in August 1965, the Netherlands recognized Singapore as a sovereign state and established diplomatic relations with it, becoming one of the first European countries to do so.: the Netherlands has an embassy in Singapore.; Singapore is accredited to the Netherlands from its embassy in Brussels, Belgium.
North Macedonia	1995	Both countries established diplomatic relations on 8 May 1995.
Poland		See Poland–Singapore relations: Poland has an embassy in Singapore.; Singapore has a non-resident ambassador based in Singapore accredited to Poland and has an honorary consulates-general in Warsaw.
Romania	30 May 1967	Romania has an embassy at the Orchard Tower in Singapore. Singapore does not have any representation in Romania. In February 2002 the Romanian president Ion Iliescu made an official visit to Singapore. In March 2002 Romania and Singapore signed a double-taxation agreement to facilitate the cross-flow of trade, investment, financial activities and technical know-how between Singapore and Romania. In November 2008, Singapore signed an open skies agreement (OSA) with Romania to allow greater flexibility on air services. In 2000, trade between Romania and Singapore was US$15.5 million, roughly balanced. The Romanian market, with a relatively cheap and skilled labor force and advantageous tax laws, has been attractive to several Singapore companies who have established joint ventures in Romania. Forte, created in 1990 as a Romanian-Singapore joint venture for computer assembly, is an example. (However, in 2006 Forte was acquired by Siemens.)
Russia	1 June 1968	See Russia–Singapore relations: Singapore maintains an embassy in Moscow.; Russia has an embassy in Singapore.; Singapore and the Soviet Union (now Russia) entered into full diplomatic relations on 1 June 1968. The two nations engaged in trade and economic cooperation. After the start of Vladimir Putin's term, Singapore and Russia strengthened ties, participating in a number of regional meetings such as the ASEAN-Russia Summit and the ASEAN Regional Forum. Both Singapore and Russia are members of APEC.
Serbia	22 August 1967	Serbia is accredited to Singapore from its embassy in Jakarta, Indonesia.; Singapore is accredited to Serbia from its embassy in Paris, France.
Spain		Singapore has a non-resident ambassador based in Singapore accredited to Spain and has honorary consulates-general in Madrid and Barcelona.; Spain has an embassy in Singapore.
Ukraine	31 March 1992	Singapore recognized Ukraine's independence on 2 January 1992.; Singapore is represented in Ukraine through its embassy in Moscow, Russia.; Since December 2002, Ukraine has an embassy (on the 16th floor of the Singapore Land Tower) and an honorary consulate in Singapore.; In 2007, the two countries commenced negotiations for a free trade agreement. In 2006, Ukraine was Singapore's 55th largest trading partner last year, with total trade amounting to S$774 million
United Kingdom	9 August 1965	See Singapore–United Kingdom relations Singaporean Prime Minister Lawrence Wong with British Prime Minister Keir Starmer at a Commonwealth summit in Apia, October 2024. Singapore established diplomatic relations with the United Kingdom on 9 August 1965.: Singapore maintains a high commission in London.; The United Kingdom is accredited to Singapore through its high commission in Singapore.; The UK governed the Singapore from 1819 to 1942 and 1946 to 1963, when Singapore achieved independence within Malaysia. Both countries share common membership of the Commonwealth, CPTPP, the Five Power Defence Arrangements, the United Nations, the World Health Organization, and the World Trade Organization. Bilaterally the two countries have a Digital Economy Agreement, a Double Taxation Agreement, a Free Trade Agreement, and an Investment Agreement.

=== Oceania ===
Country	Formal Relations Began	Notes
Australia		See Australia–Singapore relations: Australia has a High Commission in Singapore.; Singapore has a High Commission in Canberra.; In July 2003, Singapore and Australia signed a Singapore-Australia Free Trade Agreement bringing closer economic ties.; On 23 August 2005, Singapore and Australia signed a memorandum of agreement to allow Singapore Armed Forces to train on the Shoalwater Bay Training Area till 2009.; Singapore and Australia hold a biennial Singapore-Australia Joint Ministerial Conference (SAJMC) when ministers from both countries meet to discuss trade, defence and security. Both countries also collaborate in development assistance projects under the Singapore-Australia Trilateral Cooperation Program (SATCP) since 1996.
New Zealand	22 November 1965	See New Zealand–Singapore relations On 14 November 2000, New Zealand and Singapore entered into a Closer Economic Partnership (CEP) to improve relations and encourage trade and investment.: New Zealand has a High Commission in Singapore .; Singapore has a High Commission in Wellington.
Solomon Islands	21 April 1987	Both countries established diplomatic relations on 21 April 1987.

== International humanitarian effort ==
- In December 2004, during the disaster wrought by the massive tsunami that hit Indonesia, the Singapore Armed Forces dispatched three Endurance class landing platform dock ships – RSS Endurance, RSS Persistence and RSS Endeavour off the coast of Meulaboh, one of the worst hit areas where all road access was cut off. On board these ships were medical and engineering teams and volunteers with NGOs. The ships were also loaded with medical supplies and heavy equipment to help clear roads and debris. Six Chinook helicopters and two Super Puma helicopters were also dispatched to Aceh, two Chinook helicopters and two Super Puma helicopters to Phuket, Thailand. C130s were also dispatched to ferry relief supplies to tsunami-hit areas.
- In September 2005, Singapore responded to the relief effort of Hurricane Katrina in the United States, by sending four CH-47 Chinook helicopters and forty-five RSAF personnel.
- In the aftermath of the 2005 Bali bombings, the Singapore Armed Forces sent a medical team, composed of two doctors, two nurses, and two paramedics, to Bali to help treat victims of the blasts at the Sanglah Hospital.
- In October 2005, the Singapore Civil Defence Force dispatched a 44-member Disaster Assistance and Rescue Team to Pakistan to help in the relief and rescue operations following the 2005 Kashmir earthquake

== Participation in the war on terrorism ==
Singapore is affected by the war on terrorism, as demonstrated by the Singapore embassies attack plot.

During 15–17 August 2005, Singapore hosted a multi-national maritime interdiction exercise, codename Exercise Deep Sabre as part of the Proliferation Security Initiative to address the proliferation of weapons of mass destruction. Launched at Changi Naval Base and conducted in the South China Sea, the exercise involves some 2,000 personnel from 13 countries.

Singapore hosted the Regional Special Forces Counter-Terrorism Conference from 21 to 25 November 2005.

On 6 May 2004, then Prime Minister Goh Chok Tong delivered a speech at the Council on Foreign Relations in Washington, D.C., titled "Beyond Madrid: Winning Against Terrorism", expressing Singapore's view on the controversial and often criticised war on terrorism.

== International effort on anti-piracy ==
In August 2005, Malaysia, Indonesia and Singapore agreed to conduct joint anti-piracy patrols in the Malacca Strait to increase security in one of the world's busiest sea lanes. Thailand later also joined in this effort.

Indonesia, Malaysia and Singapore conduct trilateral, coordinated maritime surface patrols, known as the Malacca Strait Sea Patrols, and coordinated airborne surveillance under the 'Eyes in the Sky' arrangement. Other forms of cooperation between the littoral states include an agreement between Malaysia and Indonesia in 2007 to increase joint anti-piracy training in the Malacca Strait, the Surface Picture Surveillance System (SURPIC) launched by Singapore and Indonesia in May 2005, and the Malacca Strait Patrol Information System (MSP-IS) to share information about shipping in the Malacca Strait.

== Consulates ==
In addition to embassies or High Commissions, Singapore maintains consulates or honorary consulates in Austria, Bangladesh, Canada, Chile, People's Republic of China, Czech Republic, Denmark, Germany, Greece, Hong Kong, Hungary, India, Indonesia, Ireland, Israel, Italy, Japan, Jordan, Kazakhstan, Lebanon, Malaysia, Mexico, Nigeria, Norway, Pakistan, Papua New Guinea, Peru, Portugal, Saudi Arabia, South Korea, Spain, Sri Lanka, Switzerland (Permanent Mission in Geneva), Turkey, United Arab Emirates, United States of America and Vietnam.

== See also ==
- List of diplomatic missions in Singapore
- List of diplomatic missions of Singapore
