= Singapore–South Africa relations =

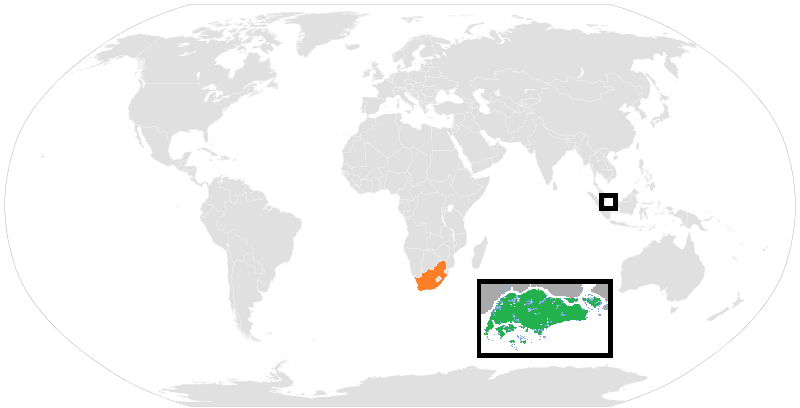
- Singapore: South Africa

The Republic of Singapore and the Republic of South Africa are independent countries which have achieved independence from Great Britain and currently maintain friendly bilateral relations. The connections between the two countries are based primarily on their membership in the Commonwealth of Nations, and their interactions in international trade and tourism. Both countries also cooperate in social and economic development issues.

Singapore has a High Commission in Pretoria while South Africa has a High Commission in Singapore.

== History ==
On August 9, 1965, Singapore was expelled from Malaysia and became an independent state. However, due to the apartheid policy, it did not establish diplomatic relations with South Africa until 1993, when the two countries signed agreements to do so. In 1994, South Africa rejoined the Commonwealth, resulting in the Embassies of both countries being renamed High Commissions and the Ambassadors becoming High Commissioners.

On 5 March 1997, Nelson Mandela became the first President of South Africa to visit Singapore, where he met President Ong Teng Cheong and Senior Minister Lee Kuan Yew. In 2007, S.R. Nathan became the first President of Singapore to visit South Africa.

In January 2013, International Enterprise Singapore set up a centre in Johannesburg, its first overseas centre in Sub-Saharan Africa.

In June 2023, Singapore and South Africa signed 2 memorandums of understanding covering information and communications technology (ICT) and human capital development.

== Economic relations ==
Singapore products exported to South Africa in 2012

South Africa products exported to Singapore in 2012

In 2011, the total trade value between Singapore and South Africa was worth S$2.54 billion (or R16 billion). In 2012, the export value from Singapore to South Africa was worth US$1.31 billion, and the export value from South Africa to Singapore was worth US$950 million.

Singaporean exports were mainly communication equipment, electrical machines, office and data machines, manufactured articles, general industrial machines, plastics, crude rubber, textiles, coffee, and spices to South Africa.

During the same period, South Africa exported mainly organic chemicals, petroleum and its products, iron and steel, non-ferrous metals, metal manufactures, vegetables, inorganic chemicals, metallic ores, and scraps and paper manufactures to Singapore.

In 2011, the direct investment value from Singapore to South Africa was worth S$491 million (or R3.23 billion), while the direct investment value from South Africa to Singapore was worth S$19.04 million (or R125 million).

The value of trade between Singapore and South Africa was US$2.2 billion in 2012, US$2.3 billion in 2013, and reached US$2.7 billion in 2022.

=== 2023-present ===
During a state visit in May 2023, Prime Ministers of both nations signed two Memorandums of Understanding (MOUs) aimed at enhancing cooperation in these crucial sectors. This collaboration marks a pivotal step in bolstering the already strong bilateral relationship, reflecting both countries' commitment to future-oriented growth and development. One MOU focuses on information and communications technology (ICT), aiming to foster cooperation through the exchange of best practices and further collaboration in both existing and emerging aspects of the field. The second MOU targets skills development, intending to improve cooperation in areas such as governance and education through knowledge exchange and capacity-building courses. These agreements are part of a broader strategy to leverage the Singapore Cooperation Program as a platform for enhancing the workforce capabilities in South Africa, with over 1,000 South African officials already benefiting from the program.

The visit also facilitated discussions on various cooperation areas, including digital transformation, water management, and sanitation, highlighting the multifaceted nature of the Singapore-South Africa partnership.

== Aviation ==
Singapore Airlines operates a flight between Singapore Changi Airport and Cape Town International Airport in South Africa, via O.R. Tambo International Airport in Johannesburg. During the 1990s, South African Airways also operated direct flights to Singapore. It later established a codeshare with Singapore Airlines on daily flights between Singapore and Johannesburg.

== See also ==
- Foreign relations of Singapore
- Foreign relations of South Africa
