= Kazakhstan–Singapore relations =

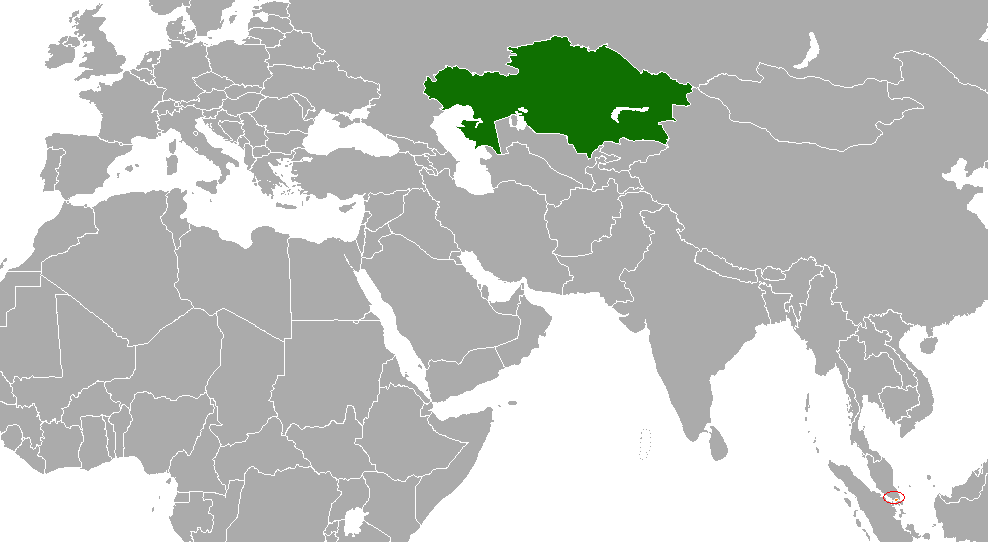

- Kazakhstan: Singapore

Kazakhstan–Singapore relations are the bilateral relations between Kazakhstan and Singapore. Kazakhstan has an embassy in Singapore. Singapore has a non resident ambassador in Kazakhstan.

== History ==
Kazakhstan established diplomatic relations with Singapore on 30 March 1993. In November 2003, Kazakhstan established a diplomatic mission in Singapore which was turned into an embassy in December 2008. Kazakhstan's Embassy in Singapore also serves as the Embassy for New Zealand and Australia. In 2023, Halimah Yacob visited Astana, becoming the first Singaporean president to visit Kazakhstan and Central Asia. Kazakhstan's president Kassym-Jomart Tokayev expressed interest in furthering export opportunities by creating a joint investment project to construct G4 City agglomeration, a business district, outside of Astana and Air Astana launching direct flights to Singapore.

During the visit, Singapore signed a Memorandum of Understanding (MOU) with Kazakhstan to train officials in Central Asia in public administration, urban planning and trade negotiations. Another MOU was signed to facilitate communication and support between Enterprise Singapore, a business collective, and Astana International Finance Centre to help grow Singaporean business in Kazakhstan. Multiple Singaporean business executives visited Astana alongside Singapore's president to sign business deals with Kazakhstan business to establish future business ventures and investment.

== Trade ==
Trade between the two nations surpassed $2 billion in volume in 2022. Kazakhstan exported $1.94 billion worth of goods to Singapore while Singapore exported $68.7 billion to Kazakhstan in 2022. The top export to Singapore was crude petroleum and the top export to Kazakhstan was gas turbines.

== See also ==
- Foreign relations of Kazakhstan
- Foreign relations of Singapore
