= Saudi Arabia–Singapore relations =

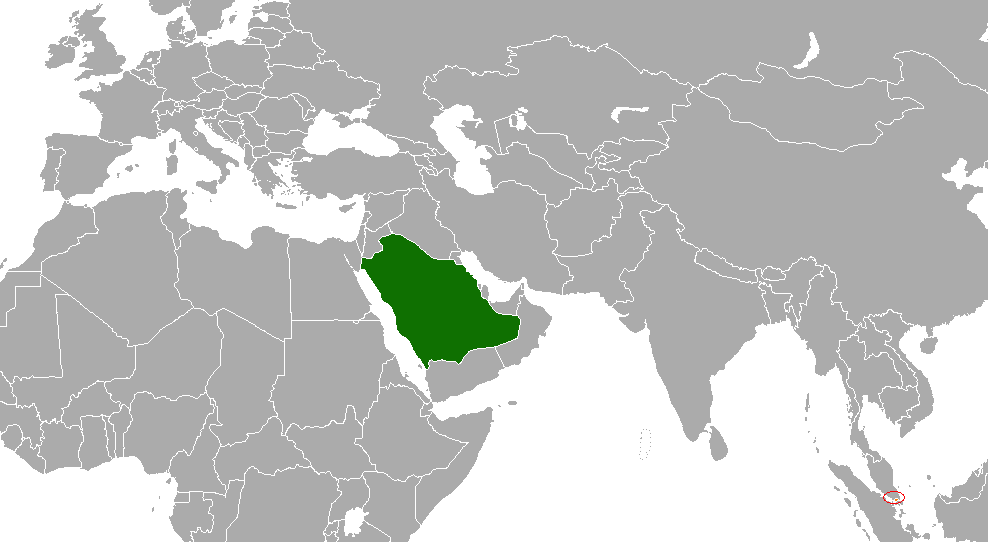
- Saudi Arabia: Singapore

Bilateral relations between the Kingdom of Saudi Arabia and the Republic of Singapore began in November 1977. On November 10, 1977, the governments of the two countries decided to upgraded their diplomatic missions in each other's countries into embassies. The Saudi Arabia opened its Embassy in Singapore in 1978. The Singapore Embassy in the Kingdom of Saudi Arabia opened on June 7, 1981. Singapore has an embassy in Riyadh and consulate general in Jeddah. Saudi Arabia has an embassy in Singapore.

== Economic relations ==
The bilateral trade between Singapore and Saudi Arabia was determined to worth S$23 billion in 2013 Much of this was due to oil, which is the major import into Singapore. Non-oil industrial Saudi companies exports their products which include crude oil, petrochemicals and plastics, aluminum, minerals, electrical appliances, materials of construction. Some Saudi companies also base their operations in Singapore, looking mostly to capitalize on the country's strategic position within the Strait of Malacca which is the heart of the Asia-Pacific market.

== See also ==
- Foreign relations of Saudi Arabia
- Foreign relations of Singapore
