= Brazil–Singapore relations =

- Brazil: Singapore

Brazil-Singapore relations are the current and historical international relations between the Federative Republic of Brazil and the Republic of Singapore. Brazil recognised Singapore's independence shortly after it became independent in 1965, and established diplomatic relations two years afterward.

== History ==
Relations between Brazil and Singapore may be traced to 1889, when flowers of Cattleya loddigesii from Buenos Aires, Pernambuco were exhibited in Singapore. In 1935, a provisional Consular Agent of Brazil, Samuel Eric Travis, was appointed; he was recognised as an Honorary Consul in 1949. In 1949, a Portuguese sloop heading to Macau celebrated the 449th anniversary of the first European landing in Brazil. Two years later, the Brazilian government considered opening a cargo ship route to Singapore. That year, five Brazilians who had fled the People's Republic of China returned to Brazil via Singapore. The Brazilian four-masted training ship Almirante Saldanha was the first Brazilian naval training vessel to visit Singapore in 1952, during its circumnavigation voyage around the world.

On 14 October 1965, Brazil became the first Latin American country to recognise Singapore's independence. On 2 November 1967, Brazil and Singapore established diplomatic relations. At first, the Brazilian ambassador to Thailand served simultaneously as ambassador to Singapore, until a Brazilian embassy in Singapore was established in 1979. Singapore's embassy in Brazil was opened in 2013 by Singapore Minister for Foreign Affairs, K. Shanmugam; this was Singapore's first embassy and only overseas mission in Latin America. The next year, Brazilian President Dilma Rousseff made a technical stop in Singapore while on her way to the G20 summit in Brisbane, Australia, becoming the first Brazilian president to visit Singapore.

== Trade relations ==
Exports from Singapore to Brazil, 1995–2015

Exports from Brazil to Singapore, 1995–2015

According to data published online by the Observatory of Economic Complexity, Singapore's exports to Brazil declined from about US$600 million in 1995 to about US$200 million in 1999. Exports remained around US$400 million between 2000 and 2004, thereafter climbing to a high of US$2.2 billion in 2005. Singapore mostly exports machinery to Brazil; the proportion of refined petroleum and chemical products in the exports also increased from 2007 and 2009 respectively.

Brazil's exports to Singapore were under US$500 million between 1995 and 2001, exceeding this value in 2002, with a dip in 2003, before showing an upwards trend from 2004 to 2008. In 2013 they reached a new high of US$3 billion. Brazil primarily exports refined petroleum and ships to Singapore.

In September 2005, International Enterprise Singapore and ApexBrasil signed a memorandum of understanding, which was renewed in 2008. Both agencies organised seminars and programmes to strengthen cooperation between companies from both countries in the fields of real estate, informations and communication technology products, services, and airport services.

In 2014, Brazil and Singapore signed an agreement to avoid double taxation on air and sea transport.

== Resident diplomatic missions ==
- Brazil has an embassy in Singapore.
- Singapore has an embassy in Brasília.
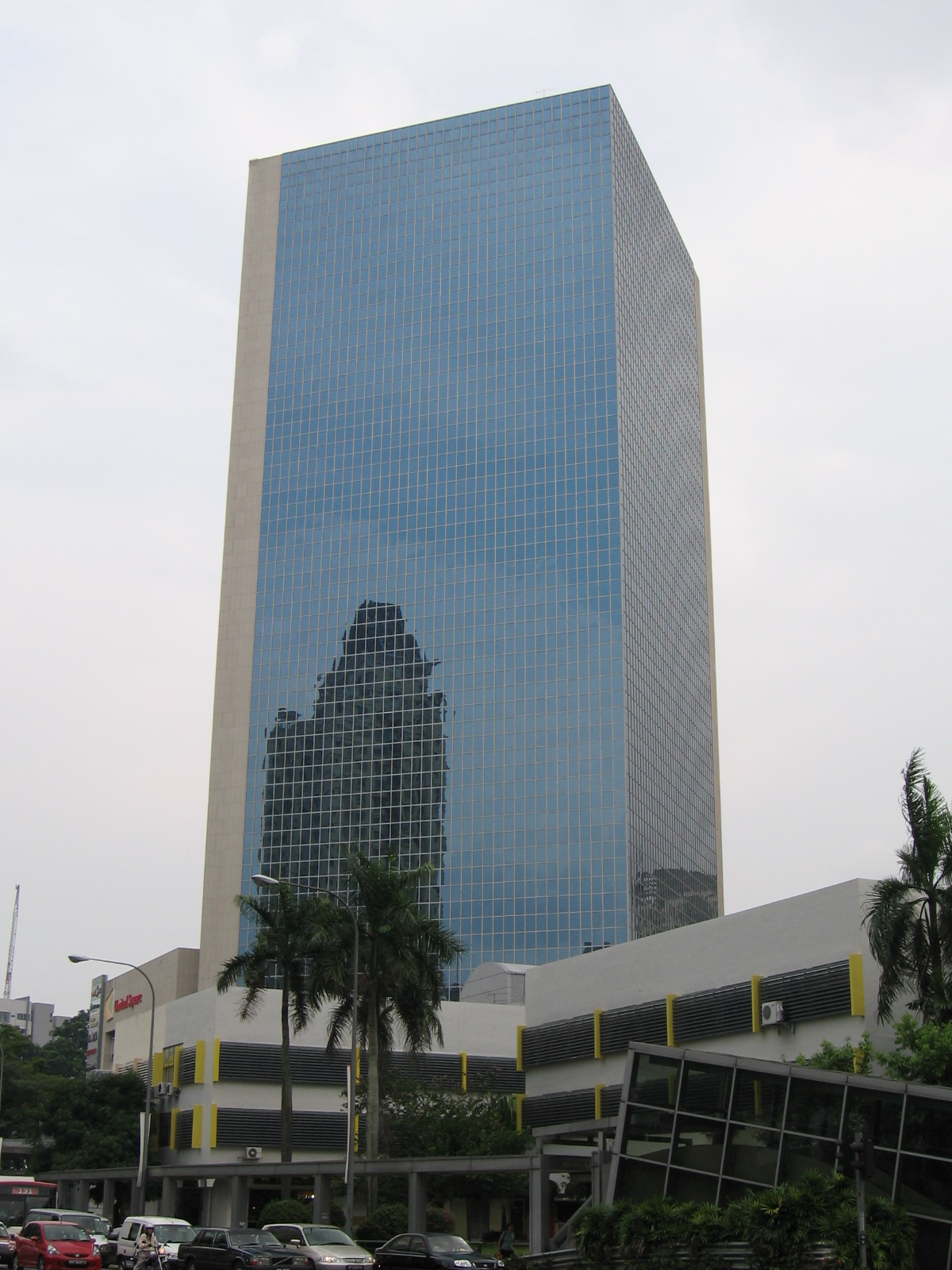
Building hosting the Embassy of Brazil in Singapore

== See also ==
- Foreign relations of Brazil
- Foreign relations of Singapore
