= Singapore–Vietnam relations =

- Singapore: Vietnam

Diplomatic mission
- Singapore Embassy, Hanoi: Vietnam Embassy, Singapore

Envoy
- Ambassador Catherine Wong: Ambassador Nguyen Tien Minh

Singapore–Vietnam relations refer to the bilateral relations between the Republic of Singapore and the Socialist Republic of Vietnam. Singapore and Vietnam started the trade relations in the 19th century. Sir Stamford Raffles founded the British colony of Singapore in 1819, while the French had founded Cochinchina in 1862 with Saigon as its capital which will later formed itself as French Indochina when the capital moved to Hanoi. Due to the anti-communist policy of Singapore, Singapore supported South Vietnam before the Fall of Saigon. Singapore also started formal diplomatic relations with North Vietnam on August 1, 1973. After the unification of Vietnam, Singapore started to improve its relations with the Socialist Republic of Vietnam. Relations worsened during the Cambodian–Vietnamese War against Angkar and its brutal Maoist movement as the Khmer Rouge cadres of Democratic Kampuchea that was aided by China and Thailand, but have improved once more after the People's Army of Vietnam withdrawal from Cambodia as the Fall of Communism came to a close in 1989 and the collapse of the Soviet Union which marked the end of the Cold War in 1991.

Singapore and Vietnam maintain multifaceted bilateral relations, and both countries are the members of the Association of Southeast Asian Nations (ASEAN).

== History ==
According to chronicles, in 1330, Malay envoys of Temasek arrived northern Vietnam and were greeted by Vietnamese prince Tran Nhat Duat, who was noted as "spoke fluently the language of Temasek."

Singapore started the trade relations with Vietnam in the 19th century by the British before the Vietnamese were occupied by the French as a colony, which some Vietnamese ships re-exported and sold products in Singapore.

Ho Chi Minh, the first President of the Democratic Republic of Vietnam, lived in Singapore after being released by the Government of Hong Kong. Nonetheless, he was arrested by the Singapore Police Force in 1932 and was deported to Hong Kong. In December 1941, Japan attacked Singapore by using military bases in Vietnam, marking the Japanese occupation of Singapore. After the Second World War, France used Singapore as a mediate to send troops and equipment to suppress the Vietnamese Independence Movement. Vietnam declared independence from France on 2 September 1945, followed by Singapore from Britain on 31 August 1963 and then from Malaysia on 9 August 1965.

Singapore implemented an anti-communist policy, making the Government of Singapore supporting South Vietnam. Prime Minister Lee Kuan Yew fully supported the US Involvement in the Vietnam War. Lee declared to President Lyndon B. Johnson that his support for the war in Vietnam was "unequivocal". Lee saw the war as necessary for countries in SEA like Singapore to buy time for stabilizing their governments and economies. When Singapore gained independence from Malaysia in 1965, South Vietnam became one of the earliest Asian nations to recognize Singapore and established diplomatic relations with it.

On August 1, 1973, Singapore established diplomatic relations with North Vietnam. In 1975, the Fall of Saigon marked the unification of Vietnam. Singapore started to improve its relations with the Socialist Republic of Vietnam. In October 1978, Phạm Văn Đồng, the Prime Minister of Vietnam, visited Singapore and became the first Prime Minister of Vietnam to visit Singapore after unification.

In December 1978, Vietnam decided to invade and occupy Cambodia due to frequent attacks by the genocidal Khmer Rouge of Pol Pot leading to the murder of thousands of Vietnamese citizens on home soil, which led to the outbreak of the Cambodian–Vietnamese War. Singapore had supported Angkar (Organization) and the Khmer Rouge in Cambodia and organized an international campaign to condemn Vietnam until Pol Pot and his Khmer Rouge cadres along with Angkar fled the capital back into the jungle near the Thai border, which had continued as a guerilla warfare from 1979 to 1997. In his memoirs, Lee Kuan Yew also recounted that in 1982, "Singapore gave the first few hundreds of several batches of AK-47 rifles, hand grenades, ammunition and communication equipment" to the Khmer Rouge. Singapore also did not recognize the People's Republic of Kampuchea.

Vietnamese troops decided to withdraw from Cambodia in 1990 deeming it stabilized enough, with the signing of the 1991 Paris Peace Agreements and the United Nations officially taking over for peacekeeping, Singapore being one of its participants. The two nations' relations began being normalized, with Vietnam also joining the Association of Southeast Asian Nations in 1995. Leaders of Singapore and Vietnam met frequently. In 2004, Phan Van Khai, the Prime Minister of Vietnam visited Singapore and signed the Joint Statement on the Comprehensive Cooperation Framework in the 21st century. In 2013, Lee Hsien Loong, the Prime Minister of Singapore, visited Vietnam and established Strategic Partnership relations with Vietnam. In 2015, Nguyen Tan Dung, the Prime Minister of Vietnam, visited Singapore twice for the funeral of Lee Kuan Yew, the former Minister Mentor of Singapore and the celebration activities of the 50th anniversary of Singapore.

== Trade relations ==
According to the data from The Observatory of Economic Complexity, in the 1990s, the exported value from Singapore to Vietnam was about 1 million US dollars, and it increased to 8 billion US dollars in 2008. Although it fell afterwards, the exported value was still about 4 billion US dollars. Refined petroleum is the main product which Singapore exports to Vietnam.

In the 1990s, the exported value from Vietnam to Singapore was about US$400 million. It increased to US$2.4 billion in 2008, then fell to US$1.6 billion in 2012, then it increased again in 2013. Crude oil is the main product which Vietnam exports to Singapore.

On May 5, 1993, the Vietnam–Singapore Cooperation Commission was established. On December 6, 2005, the Ministry of Trade and Industry of Singapore and the Ministry of Industry and Trade of Vietnam signed Framework Cooperation on Vietnam–Singapore Connectivity in Singapore including 6 aspects such as finance, investment, trade and services, transportation, information and telecommunication technology, education and training. The Framework Cooperation was effective on January 23, 2006. In 2014, Singapore was the third largest foreign investor in Vietnam, which totally invested 32.7 billion US dollars and contributed to 1,300 projects. Bình Dương Province, Haiphong, Bắc Ninh Province, Quảng Ngãi Province, Hải Dương Province and Nghệ An in Vietnam have Vietnam–Singapore Industrial Parks. Supporting these commercial activities is the Vietnam Chamber of Commerce in Singapore, a trade association that assists Vietnamese enterprises operating in or expanding through Singapore.

On September 13, 2013, Lim Hng Kiang, the Minister for Trade and Industry of Singapore and Bùi Quang Vinh, the Minister of Planning and Investment of Vietnam, hosted the 9th Singapore-Vietnam Connectivity Meeting held in Ho Chi Minh City.

== Cultural relations ==
Since 1992, 16,000 Vietnamese officials accepted training from the Singapore Cooperation Programme, including healthcare, environment, finance, trade, productivity, public management and English training. In 2002, the Vietnam–Singapore Training Centre was established in Hanoi.

The Ministry of Education of Singapore provides scholarships to Vietnamese students who have finished their junior secondary school studies and have good performance in English and extracurricular activities.

== See also ==
- Foreign relations of Singapore
- Foreign relations of Vietnam
