= Mexico–Singapore relations =

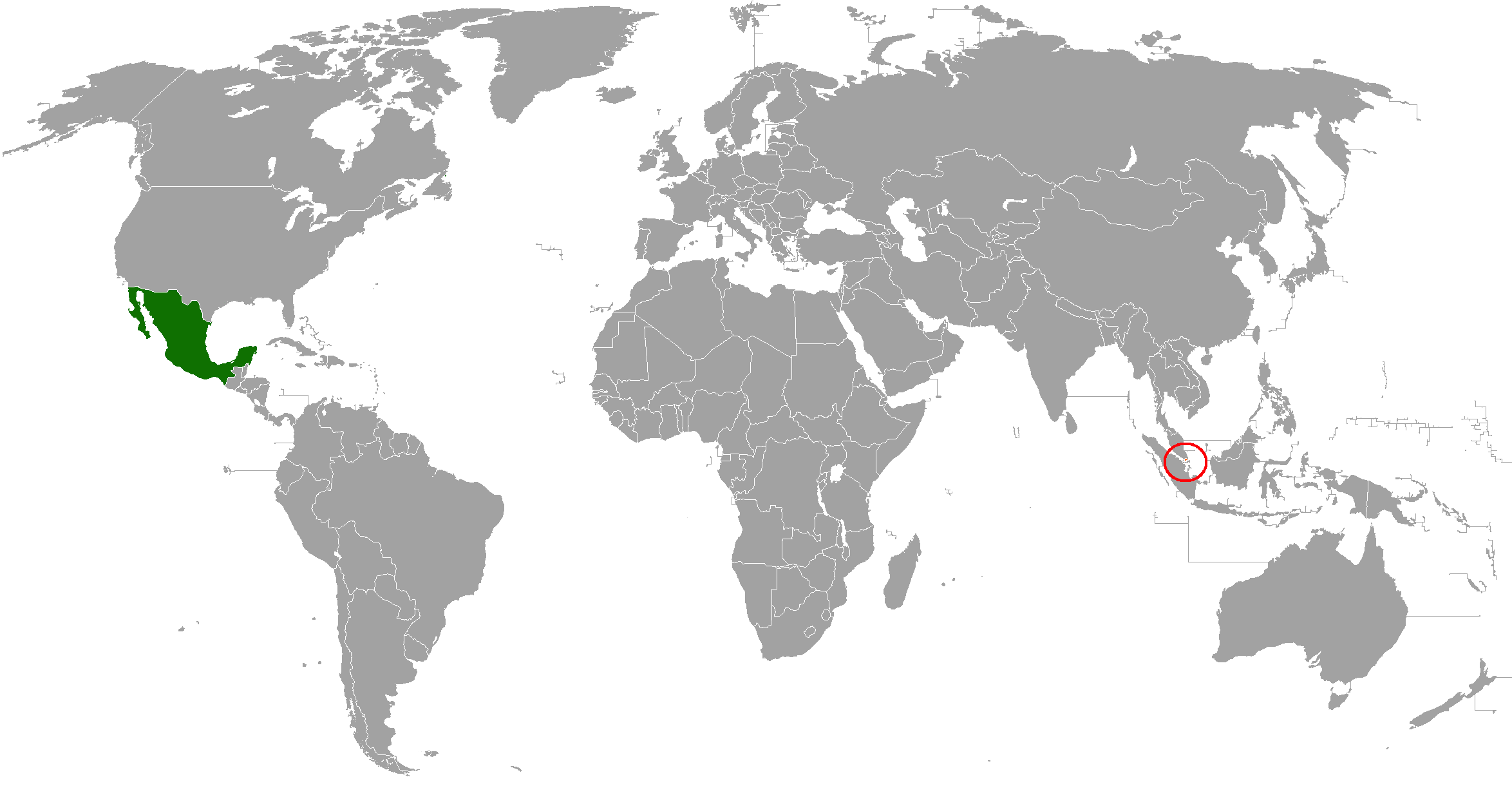

- Mexico: Singapore

The nations of Mexico and Singapore established diplomatic relations in 1975. Both nations are members of the Asia-Pacific Economic Cooperation, Forum of East Asia–Latin America Cooperation and the United Nations.

== History ==
Mexico recognized and established diplomatic relations with Singapore on 22 December 1975. In 1990, Mexico opened a resident embassy in Singapore. Singapore has since operated a non-resident embassy based in Singapore and maintains an honorary consulate-general based in Mexico City.

Since the establishment of diplomatic relations; the relations between the two countries has developed continuously based on common international positions and companionship. In 1990, President Carlos Salinas de Gortari became the first Mexican head-of-state to visit Singapore. In 1991, Senior Minister Lee Kuan Yew paid an official visit to Mexico. Since the initial visits, there have been several high-level visits between leaders of both nations.

In September 2012, Mexican President Felipe Calderón visited Singapore and met with President Tony Tan and Prime Minister Lee Hsien Loong. President Calderón delivered a speech in The Fullerton Hotel Singapore titled "A Mexican Perspective on the Global Economy" for the International Institute for Strategic Studies.

In October 2013, Mexican Foreign Minister José Antonio Meade visited Singapore and met with Minister of Finance Tharman Shanmugaratnam and Foreign Minister K. Shanmugam. In 2014, K. Shanmugam visited Mexico and met with Jose Antonio Meade. He also attended a Business Breakfast Roundtable organized by ProMéxico and addressed a speech called "Bridging the Pacific: The Singapore-Mexico Partnership" with diplomats, business leaders and private sector personalities attending the Roundtable.

In June 2016, Singaporean President Tony Tan paid an official visit to Mexico and met with Mexican President Enrique Peña Nieto. His arrival to Mexico coincided with the 40th anniversary of diplomatic relations between the two nations. During President Tan's four day visit to Mexico, both nations signed agreements on trade and improved cooperation in science and education as well as the promotion of the Trans-Pacific Partnership Agreement (TPP).

In November 2019, Prime Minister Lee Hsien Loong paid a visit to Mexico and met with Mexican President Andrés Manuel López Obrador. During the visit, President López Obrador announced that Singapore would partake in the development of the Isthmus of Tehuantepec in southern Mexico. In 2022, both nations held their 5th Meeting for Political Consultation Mechanism which was hosted in Singapore and attended by Mexican Foreign Undersecretary Carmen Moreno Toscano.

In November 2025, Singaporean President Tharman Shanmugaratnam arrived to Mexico for a State visit and to celebrate 50 years of diplomatic relations between both nations. During the visit, President Shanmugaratnam met with President Claudia Sheinbaum and announced his country's intention to open an embassy in Mexico City in 2026. The embassy of Singapore was opened in April 2026.

== High-level visits ==
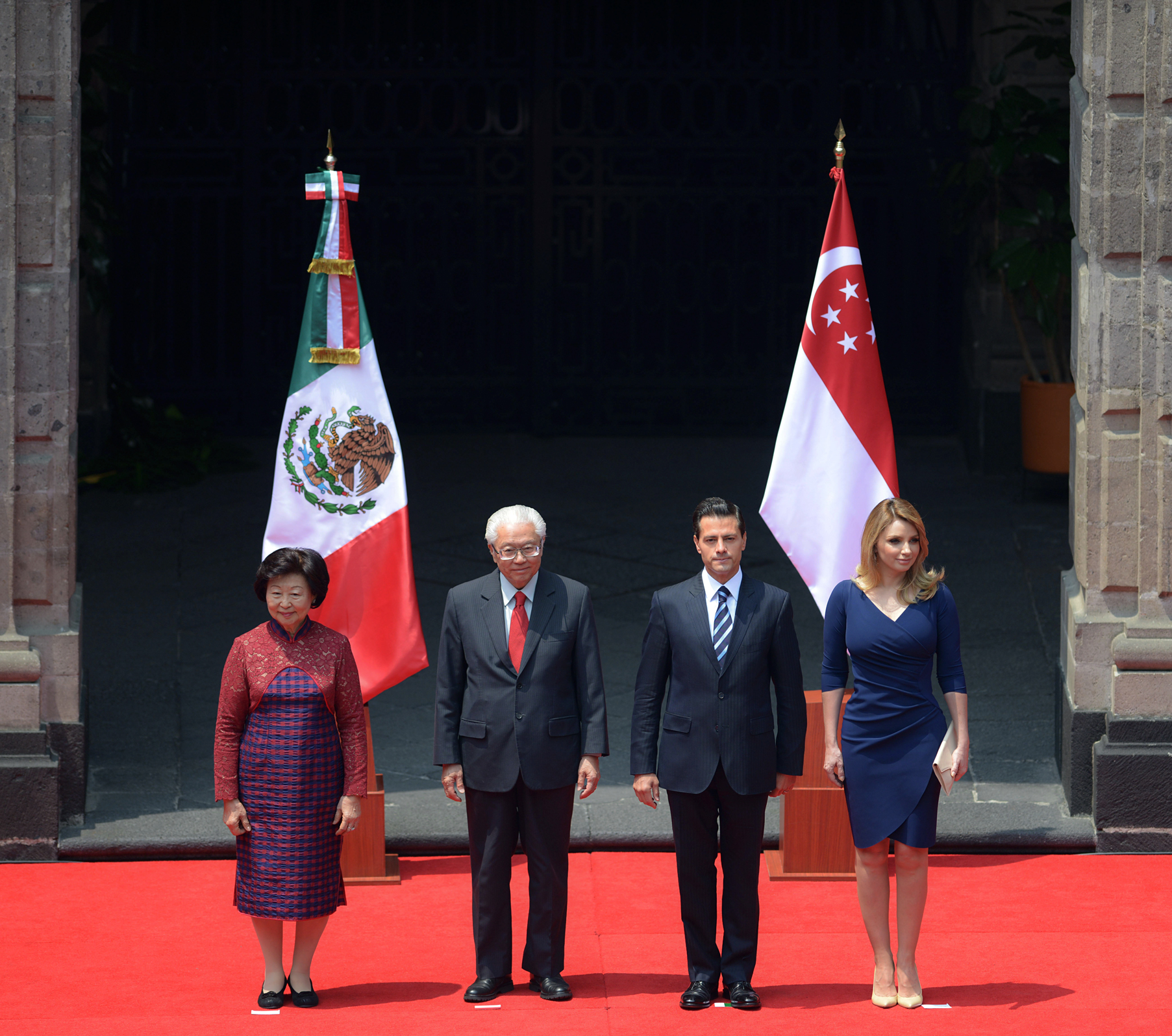
Singaporean President Tony Tan and Mexican President Enrique Peña Nieto in Mexico City; 2016.

High-level visits from Mexico to Singapore

- President Carlos Salinas de Gortari (1990)
- President Ernesto Zedillo (1996, 2000)
- President Felipe Calderón (2009, 2012)
- Foreign Minister José Antonio Meade (2013)
- Foreign Undersecretary Carlos de Icaza (2016)
- Foreign Undersecretary Carmen Moreno Toscano (2022)

High-level visits from Singapore to Mexico

- Senior Minister Lee Kuan Yew (1991)
- Prime Minister Goh Chok Tong (1997)
- Foreign Minister K. Shanmugam (2014)
- President Tony Tan (2016)
- Prime Minister Lee Hsien Loong (2019)
- President Tharman Shanmugaratnam (2025)

== Bilateral agreements ==
Both nations have signed several bilateral agreements, such as an Agreement on Air Services (1990); Agreement to Avoid Double Taxation and Prevent Tax Evasion in the Matter of Income Taxes (1994); Agreement on the Promotion and Reciprocal Protection of Investments (2009); Memorandum of Understanding on International Development Cooperation (2016); Memorandum of Understanding on Cooperation in the Field of Education (2016); and a Memorandum of Understanding on Agricultural and Food Cooperation (2016).

== Trade relations ==
In 2018, both nations became signatories of the Comprehensive and Progressive Agreement for Trans-Pacific Partnership. In 2023, trade between Mexico and Singapore totaled US$3.8 billion. Mexico main exports to Singapore include: digital process units; telephones and mobile phones, electronics, copper ores and concentrates, chemical based products, unwrought lead, minerals, alcohol, fruits and coffee. Singapore's main exports to Mexico include: diodes, transistors, and similar semiconductors; machinery and parts, oil, various types of instruments, parts and accessories for vehicles, medicine, gold, platinum and other precious metals. Over 200 Singaporean companies multinational companies operate in Mexico, such as Banyan Group, Flex Ltd., Keppel Ltd. and ST Engineering. At the same time, over 81 Mexican multinational companies operate in Singapore, such as Cemex and Gruma.

== Resident diplomatic missions ==
- Mexico has an embassy in Singapore.
- Singapore has an embassy in Mexico City.

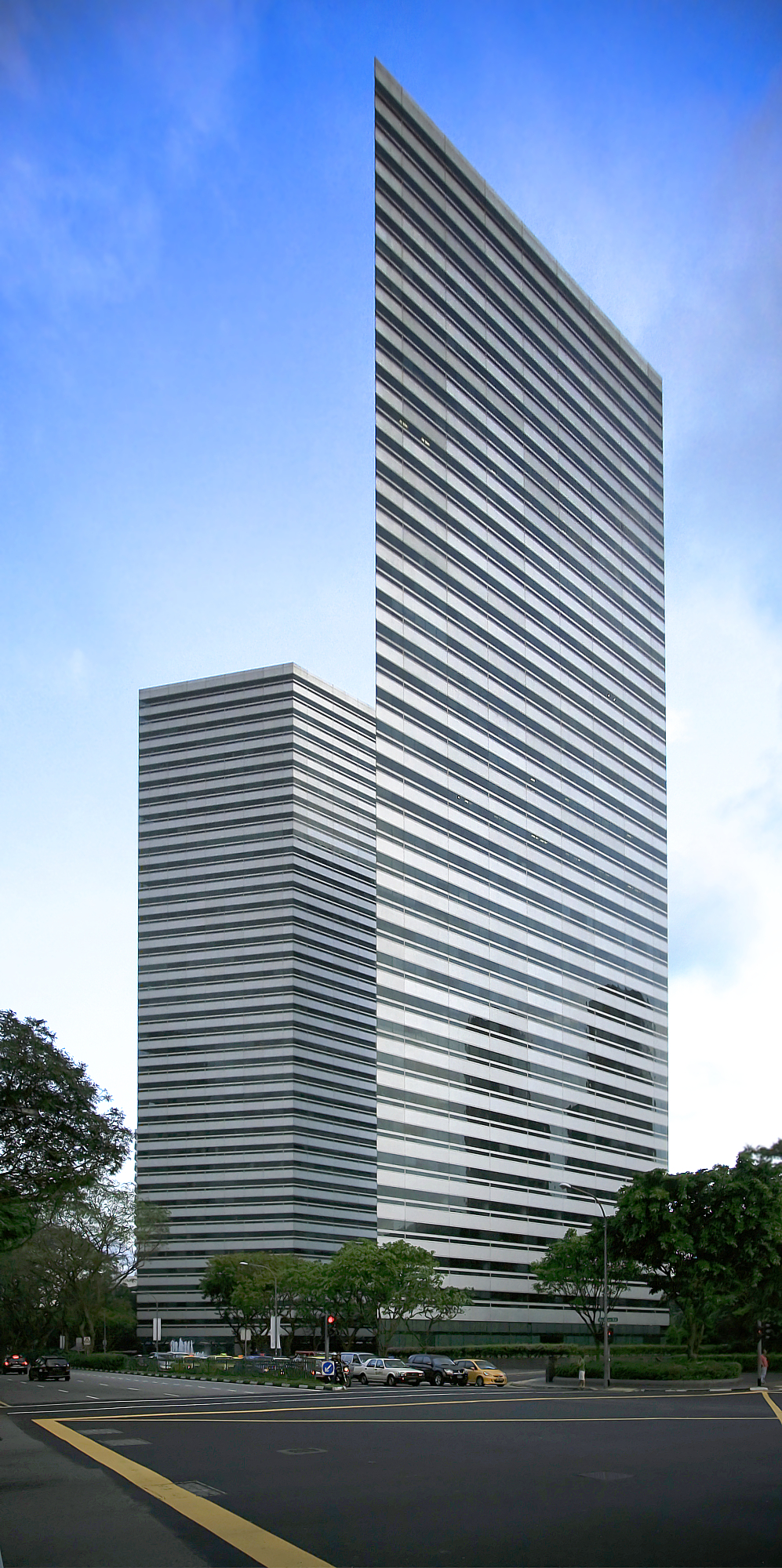
The Gateway Singapore building hosting the Embassy of Mexico in Singapore

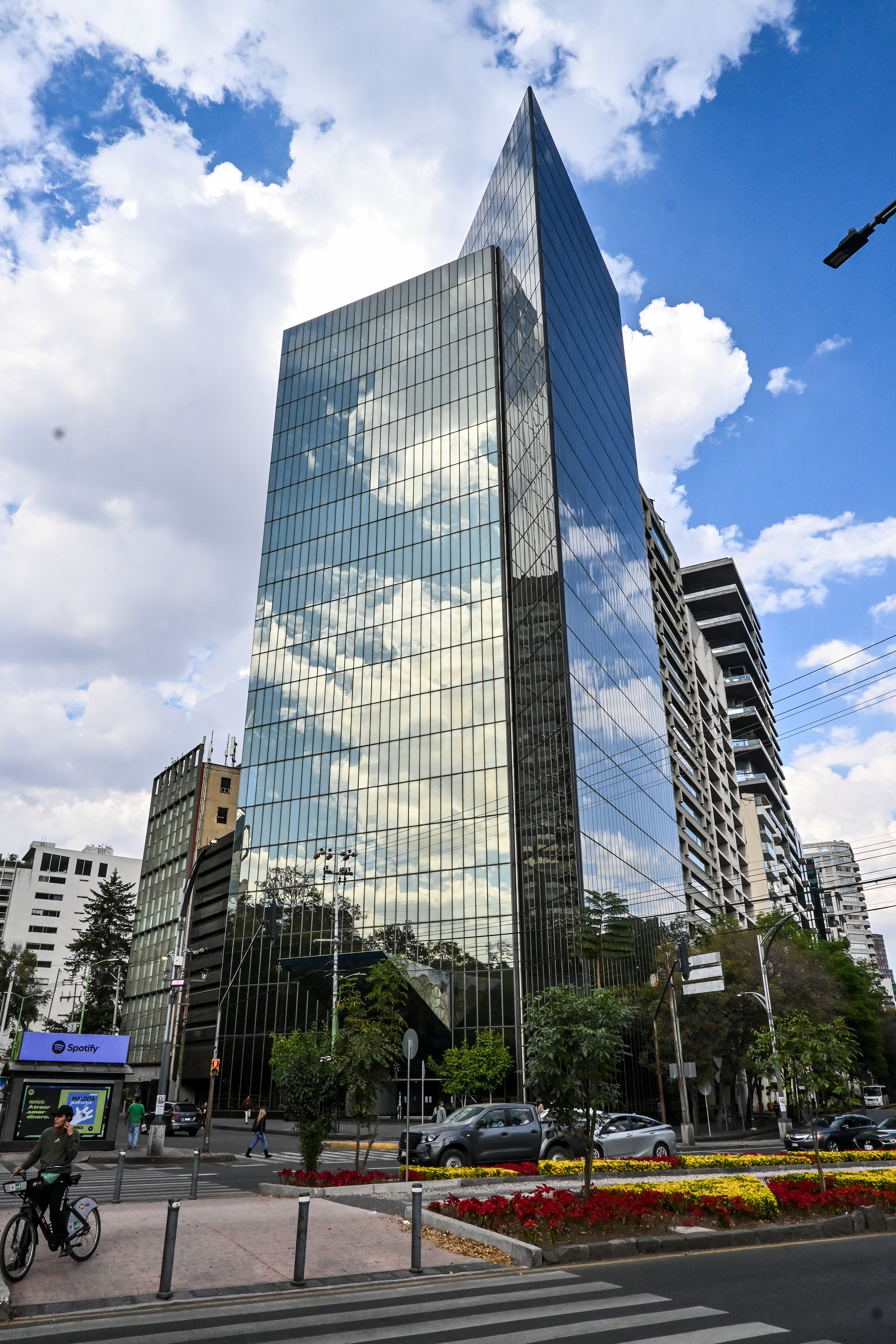
Torre Chapultepec hosting the Embassy of Singapore in Mexico City

== See also ==
- Foreign relations of Mexico
- Foreign relations of Singapore
