= Germany–Singapore relations =

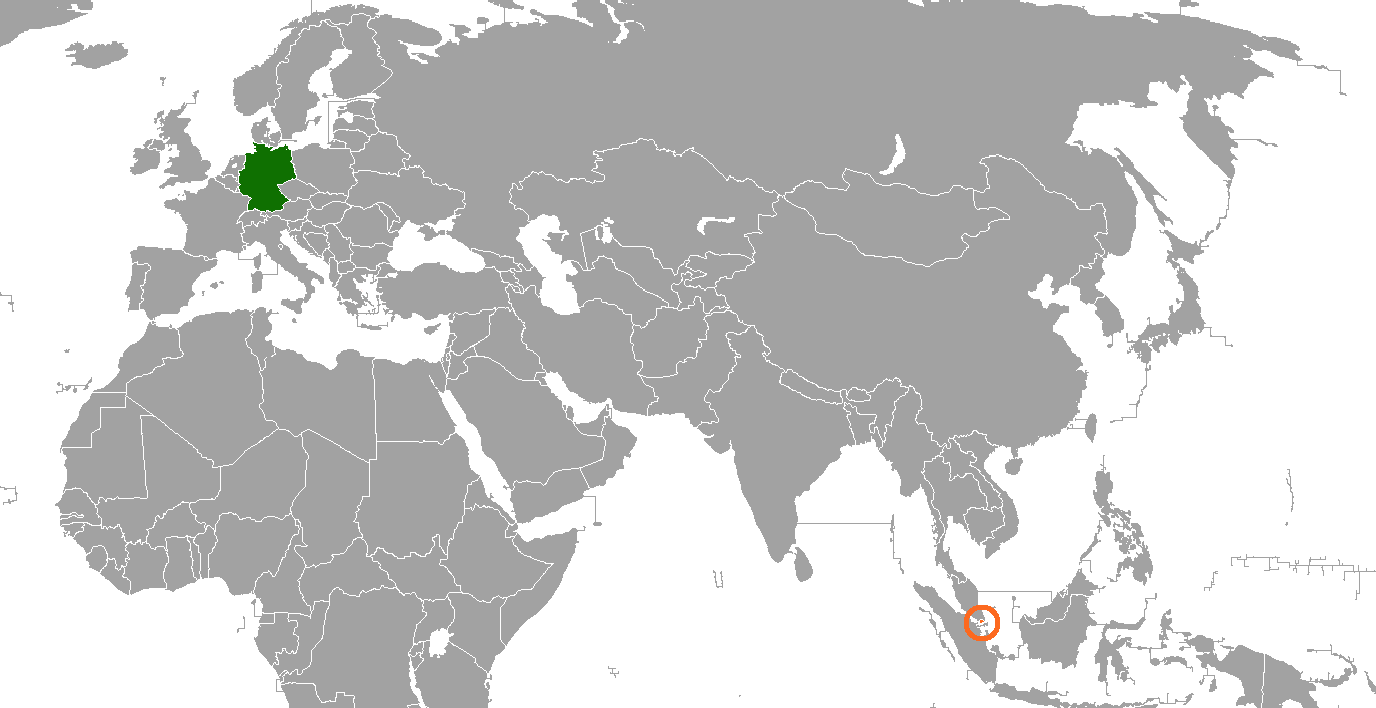

- Germany: Singapore

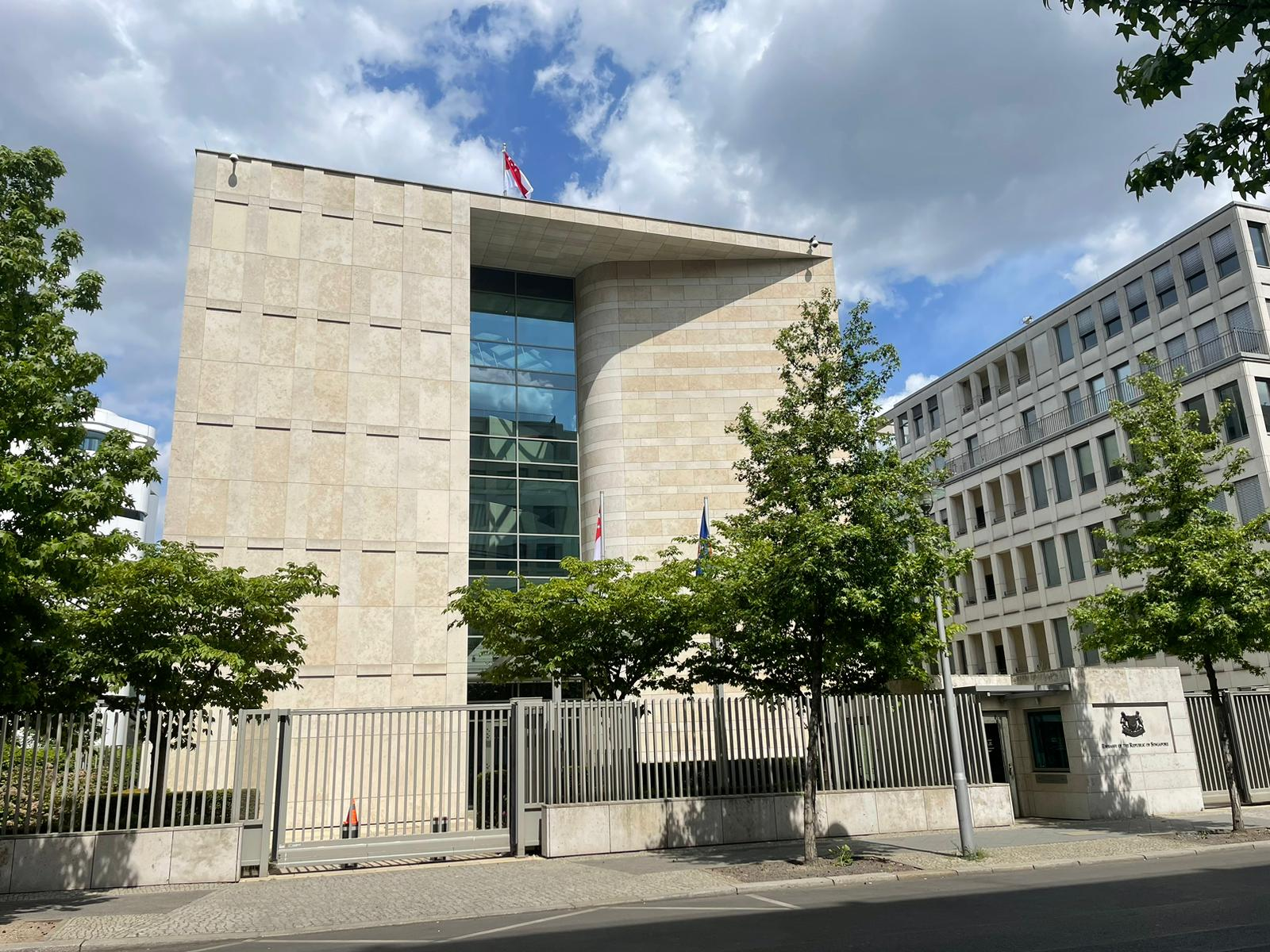
Embassy of Singapore in Berlin

Germany–Singapore relations refer to the bilateral relations between the Federal Republic of Germany and the Republic of Singapore.

== History ==
A major impact made by Germany in modern history took place when the SMS Emden raided the South and Southeast Asia region during World War I. The light cruiser had made a daring raid of the British port of Penang soon after the war started, and brought the Malay Peninsula into the war.

Following the Cold War between the 1970s and 1980s, West Germany Chancellor Helmut Schmidt maintained close ties with Singapore Prime Minister Lee Kuan Yew. An orchid hybrid was also named after Mrs Hannelore "Loki" Schmidt when she visited the Singapore Botanic Gardens in 1978.

== Bilateral relations ==
Singapore and Germany began building relations more publicly after the breakup of the communist Soviet Union and the fall of the Iron Curtain that saw the unification of East Germany and West Germany.

On 10 August 1973, Singapore built the relations of East Germany.

On 18 November 2024, at a G20 summit in Rio de Janeiro, Germany and Singapore announced a strategic partnership between the two countries with a focus on clean energy, AI, and security.

=== Defence ===
Germany is a member of the NATO while Singapore remains as a member of the Commonwealth of Nations, both of which involve the United Kingdom as a leading member and ally. In 2015, the Singapore Army has undergone a major upgrade exercise of the armour arsenal that saw the Ministry of Defence procuring refurbished Leopard 2 tanks as the primary battle tank of armour-related operations since 2008. The Leopard 2 series eventually replaced all the aging French AMX-13 tanks in the 21st century, while bilateral military training exercises are held as recently as 2015 in the Bergen NATO Training Area of Germany.

Singapore and Germany signed a joint declaration of intent on cyber security cooperation on 6 July 2017. In accordance with declaration Singapore's Cyber Security Agency and Germany's Federal Foreign Office have regular information exchanges, and share best practices to promote innovation.

In 2023, German Chief of Navy, Vice Admiral (VADM) Jan Christian Kaack visited Minister for Defence Dr Ng Eng Hen and "reaffirmed the warm and growing defence relations" between the two countries.

=== Trade and investment ===
As of 2015, leaders of both Germany and Singapore met in Berlin and are still working on a free trade agreement between Singapore and the European Union.

=== State visits ===
German Chancellor Schmidt continued making informal state visits as recent as 2012 when he met with long-time friend, former Singapore Prime Minister Lee Kuan Yew. On 2 November 2017, President Halimah Yacob hosted a state banquet when German President Frank-Walter Steinmeier visited Singapore. In February 2026, German Foreign Minister Johann Wadephul visited Singapore, along with Australia, Brunei, New Zealand and Tonga, as part of a diplomatic tour of the Western Pacific area.

== Diplomatic Representations ==
Germany is represented in Singapore at the Deutsche Botschaft Singapur with Ambassador Dr Ulrich A. Sante while Singapore is represented in Germany at the Singapore Embassy near Potsdamer Platz by Ambassador Jai S Sohan.

== See also ==
- Foreign relations of Germany
- Foreign relations of Singapore
