= United Square =

The United Square is a French-originated strategy game, known for its commercial slogan, "Small, Smart, Simple and Strategic". United Square is a board game, a card game and interactive game software for PC's and most tablets. It is a game of logic that may be considered to fall under the same category as chess and checkers, for advance players resort to employing strategy and deep reflection in outwitting their opponents in order to win a match.

== History ==
The United Square game was conceptualized and created by Julien Selz sometime in 2011. The game was featured and is presently among the collection of playable online board games in the website Board Game Arena, which is a free gaming site which provides new gaming experience to board game aficionados by connecting board gaming with video gaming.

United Square was registered with the United States Patent and Trademark Office on January 17, 2012, under Registration No. 4086595 and with the Institut National de la Propriété Industrielle (INPI) in Paris, France under Registration No. 2011 0162 in 2011 On September 10, 2012, United Square unveiled its new version and packaging that carries the name Cube², literally Cube Square. Improvements were added to the new graphics on the tiles, the weight is much lighter and the size much smaller making it much easier to carry around.

== Rules ==
The board game is composed of 24 square tiles; each tile piece is designed with 4 triangles colored Blue, Red, Yellow and Green. The game can be played by 2 to 4 players (exists in 1 player mode in all Digital Versions for PC, IOS App and Android) where the number of tiles is divided equally among the number of players. Two colors will be assigned to 2 players and one color for players more than two. The players, alternately, place their own tile pieces beside another tile piece completing a single colored square figure. A player gains one point for every complete square figure containing his own color. The game is considered finished when the tiles pieces have all been used or no more tiles could be placed. The player earning the most points wins the game.

== Strategy ==
Advanced players resort to strategy to block an opponent's move and sometimes even forcing the latter to place a tile to gain points in his favor. The game can be compared to the game of chess, where players use tactics to plan moves ahead and strategically place the tile pieces to gain advantage over an opponent. Though it is said that the game is as easy as playing checkers, playing United Square game requires constant concentration and deep knowledge of the possible color combinations of tiles to anticipate your move or that of an opponent's.

== Versions ==
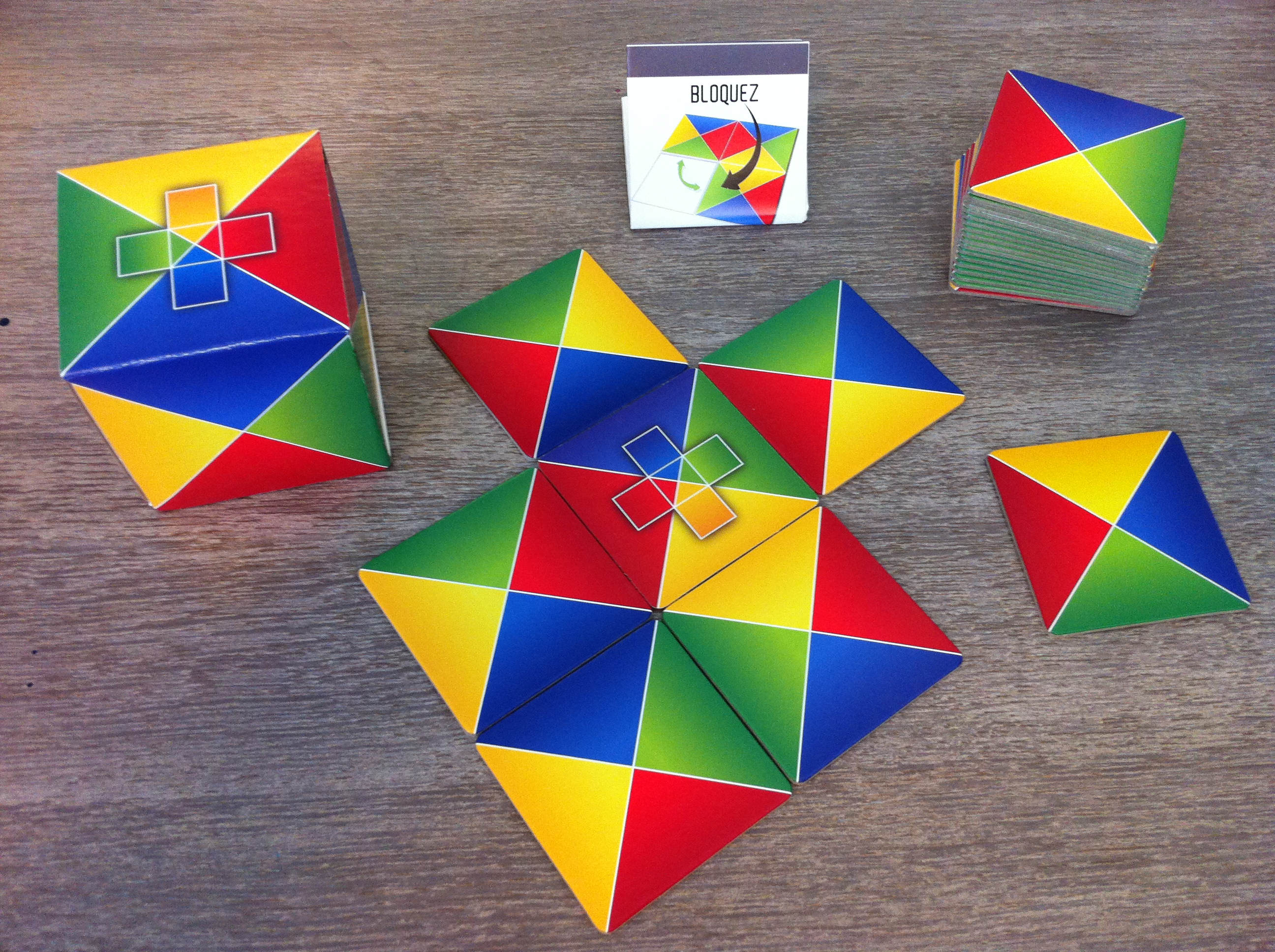
A United Square Pocket Size version

Different commercial and non-commercial versions have been made since its conception in 2011 catering to user's varying preferences.

- Pocket Size Cube or the Cube² similar to a card game, this version can be considered as one of the smallest board games around.
- United Square Board Game is the classic format.
- United Square Digital versions which are free applications can be downloaded from the official website to run on PC and is also available both in Google Play and the Apple Store. Different game levels from Novice, Amateur, Pro, Expert and Master are available on these versions allowing players to progress on their play while enjoying every match.

Early 2013, the United Square tile designs was adapted to the twisty puzzles, a format quite similar to the famous Rubik's Cube.
