= Kosovo–Singapore relations =

Kosovan–Singaporean relations
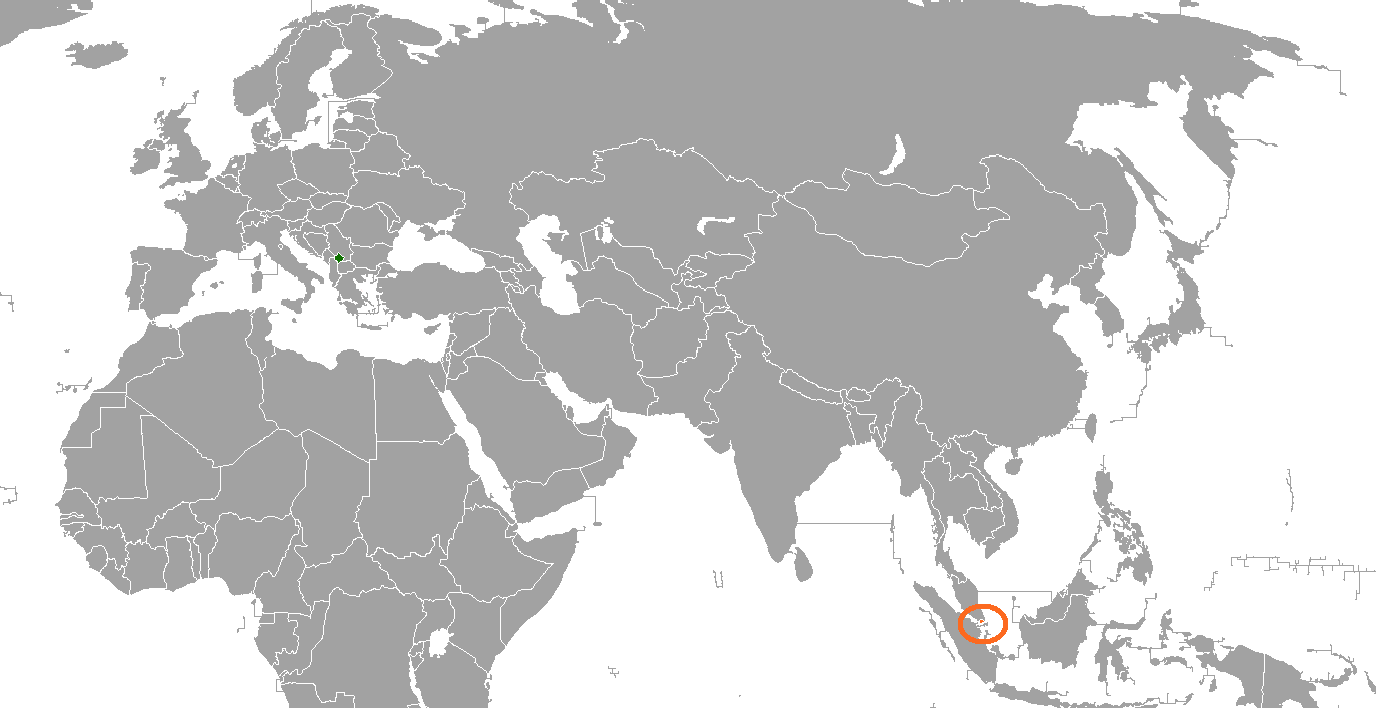
- Kosovo: Singapore

Kosovan–Singaporean relations are foreign relations between the Republic of Kosovo and the Republic of Singapore. Singapore recognised the Republic of Kosovo as an independent state on 1 December 2016. Kosovo and Singapore established diplomatic relations on 1 December 2016.

== History ==
On 18 February 2008, the Singaporean Foreign Ministry issued a statement through its spokesman regarding Kosovo's declaration of independence: "Singapore is still studying the matter. This is a controversial move that has many complex ramifications around the world. The situation under international law is not clear and the kind of precedent that could be set needs to be carefully assessed. We hope international mediation efforts would continue so that a solution acceptable to all parties can be found". According to the Serbian Foreign Minister, Vuk Jeremić, who met with Singaporean officials in August 2008, Singapore does not intend to recognise Kosovo and it considers the unilateral declaration a dangerous precedent which could cause instability throughout the world.

On 8 October the representative of Singapore at the UN said that he was sympathetic to the quest of the people of Kosovo, as they, indeed, had suffered terrible treatment in the past and that many countries had expressed sympathy for some form of autonomy for Kosovo. However he said that to date, Singapore had not supported Kosovo's unilateral declaration of independence, and was concerned about the precedent it could set. He also said that Singapore preferred that the matter be resolved peacefully by the concerned parties.

In a 25 September 2010 meeting between the Foreign Ministers of Kosovo and Singapore, Skënder Hyseni and George Yeo, Mr. Yeo said that Singapore had been awaiting the outcome of the ICJ case before making a decision on recognising Kosovo. Now that the court has made its decision, Singapore is studying it very carefully.

In March 2012, Singaporean Foreign Minister, K. Shanmugam, said that Singapore would reconsider its position on Kosovo's independence in the light of recent developments there, and in the framework of the EU integration perspective. On 26 September 2012, Shanmugam said that Singapore has a very positive attitude to the independent state of Kosovo and would consider the request to recognise it.

In September 2014, Shanmugam said that Singapore considers the developments in Kosovo as positive and emphasised the possibility for recognition of Kosovo, under a process which requires more time.

== State visits ==
- Minister of Foreign Affairs of the Republic of Kosovo, Enver Hoxhaj, visited Singapore on 23 January 2017.
