= Poland–Singapore relations =

- Poland: Singapore

Poland–Singapore relations are bilateral relations between Poland and Singapore. Both nations are full members of the World Trade Organization and the United Nations.

== History ==
An honorary consulate of Poland was located in Singapore from 1935 to 1939.

Relations between the two countries predated the establishment of formal diplomatic ties. In 1966, Singaporean Prime Minister Lee Kuan Yew visited Poland as part of a goodwill mission to Eastern Europe and met Polish Prime Minister Józef Cyrankiewicz. Polish architect and urban planner Krystyn Olszewski later served as chief designer of Singapore's first Concept Plan in 1971. Elements of the plan included the development of satellite towns around the central water catchment and the eventual relocation of Singapore's international airport to Changi.

Following the Proclamation of Singapore, bilateral diplomatic relations were established in April 1969. Poland subsequently established a resident diplomatic presence in Singapore, with the Polish ambassador based there since 2004.

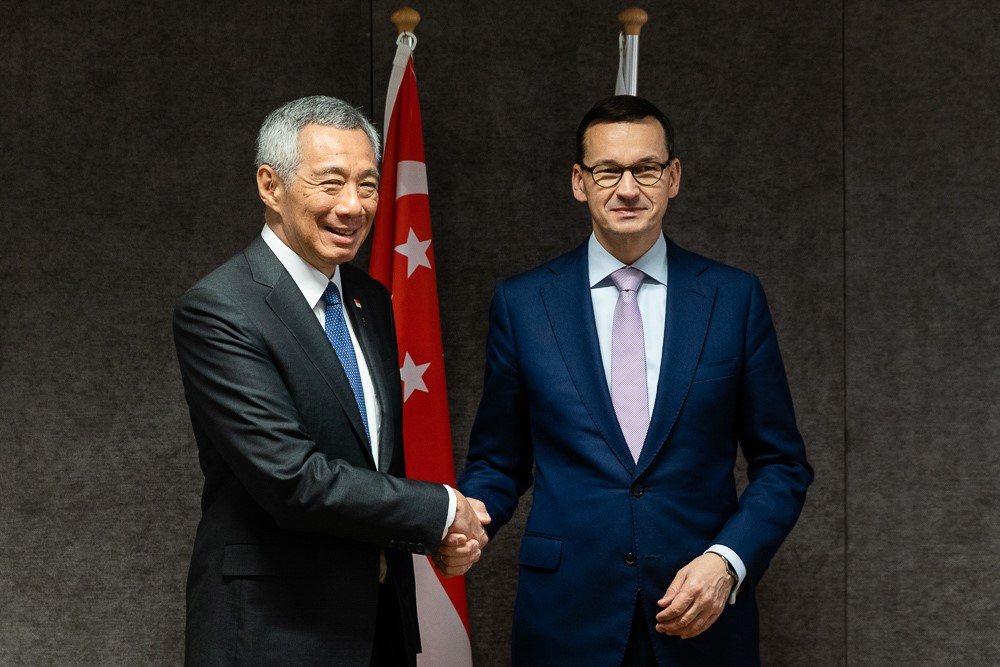
Prime Ministers Lee Hsien Loong and Mateusz Morawiecki during the 12th Asia–Europe Meeting summit in Brussels in 2018

== Bilateral agreements ==
Poland and Singapore signed an agreement on the promotion and protection of investments on 3 June 1993, which entered into force on 29 December 1993. A revised agreement for the avoidance of double taxation was signed in Singapore on 4 November 2012 and entered into force on 6 February 2014, replacing the earlier tax agreement between the two countries..

== High-level visits ==
Singaporean President Tony Tan made a state visit to Poland from 21 to 23 May 2017, the first state visit to Poland by a Singaporean head of state. During the visit, Tan and Polish President Andrzej Duda witnessed the signing of three memoranda of understanding covering economic cooperation and scientific research and jointly opened a Poland–Singapore Business Forum.

In September 2024, Polish Foreign Minister Radosław Sikorski visited Singapore during the 55th anniversary year of diplomatic relations. He met Prime Minister Lawrence Wong, Foreign Minister Vivian Balakrishnan and Senior Minister Teo Chee Hean, with discussions covering economic cooperation, food security, security issues and international affairs.

President Andrzej Duda made a state visit to Singapore from 11 to 13 June 2025, becoming the first Polish president to visit Singapore in more than 20 years. Duda met President Tharman Shanmugaratnam and Prime Minister Lawrence Wong, with discussions covering port and logistics development, agri-food trade, sustainable energy, digitalisation, research and education.

High-level visits from Poland to Singapore

- Prime Minister Leszek Miller (2003)
- President Aleksander Kwaśniewski (2004)
- Prime Minister Marek Belka (2005)
- Prime Minister Donald Tusk (2012)
- President Andrzej Duda (2025)

High-level visits from Singapore to Poland

- Prime Minister Lee Hsien Loong (2013)
- President Tony Tan (2017)

== Economic relations ==
In 2024, Singaporean goods exports to Poland reached a value of approximately €802 million, while Polish goods exports to Singapore reached a value of approximately €377 million. Since 2010, trade in goods between the two countries reached its highest value in 2015, when Singaporean exports to Poland reached €928 million, while Polish exports to Singapore reached €788 million.

Since 2013, Polish exports of services to Singapore have significantly exceeded Singaporean exports of services to Poland. In 2022, the value of Polish exports of services to Singapore amounted to approximately €633.4 million, while the value of Singaporean exports of services to Poland amounted to approximately €316.0 million.

Economic ties expanded following the entry into force of the European Union–Singapore Free Trade Agreement in 2019. By 2024, bilateral trade in goods had increased by approximately 50 per cent compared with 2019, reaching nearly S$1.7 billion. Trade in services reached nearly S$700 million in 2023. Around 170 Polish companies were operating in Singapore by 2025.

Singaporean investment in Poland has included transport and logistics infrastructure. In 2019, PSA International invested in the Deepwater Container Terminal in Gdańsk, now known as Baltic Hub, alongside the Polish Development Fund and IFM Global Infrastructure Fund. PSA subsequently invested in Polish intermodal operator Loconi in 2024.

== Diplomatic missions ==
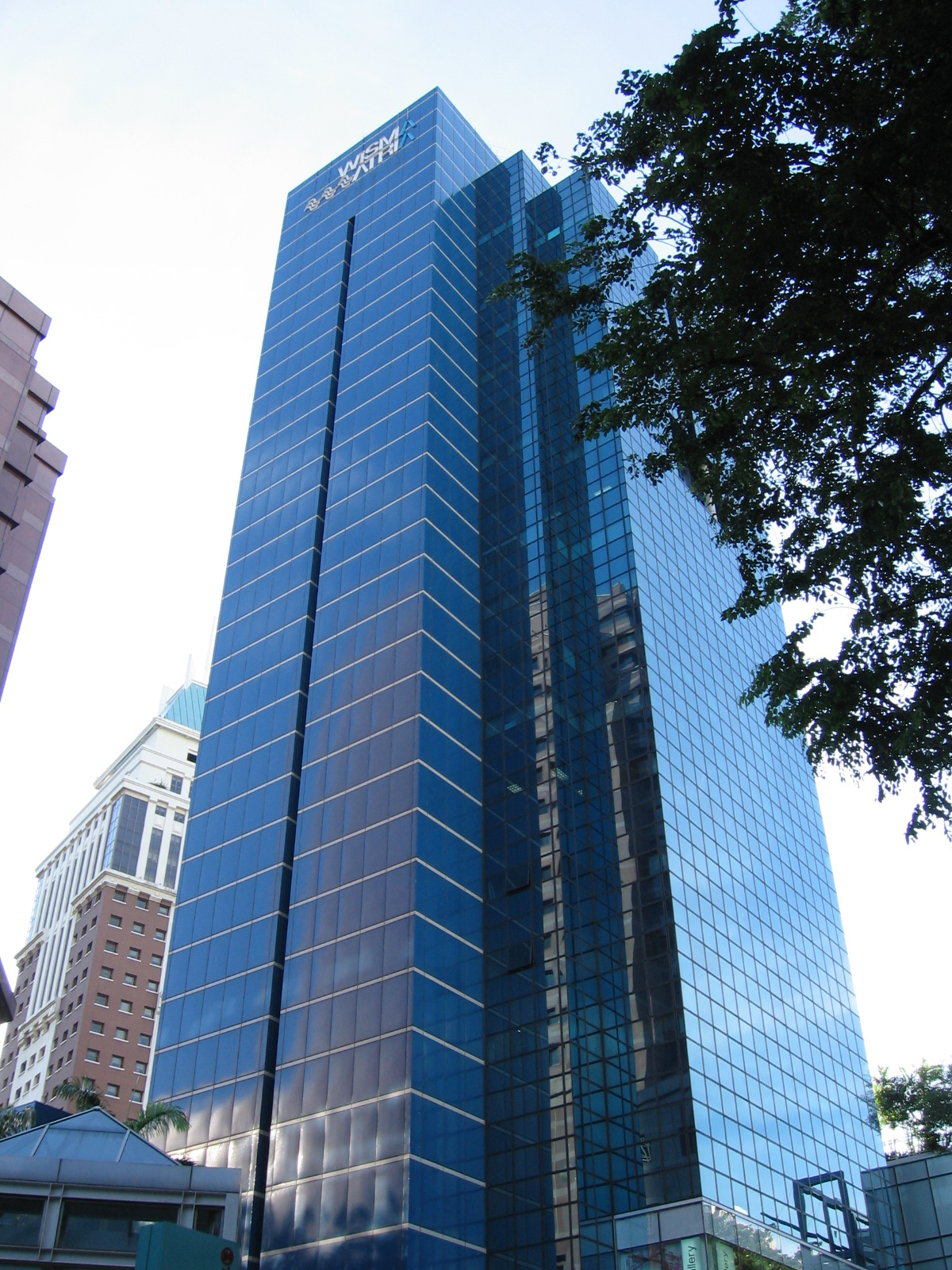
Wisma Atria, the building hosting the Embassy of Poland in Singapore

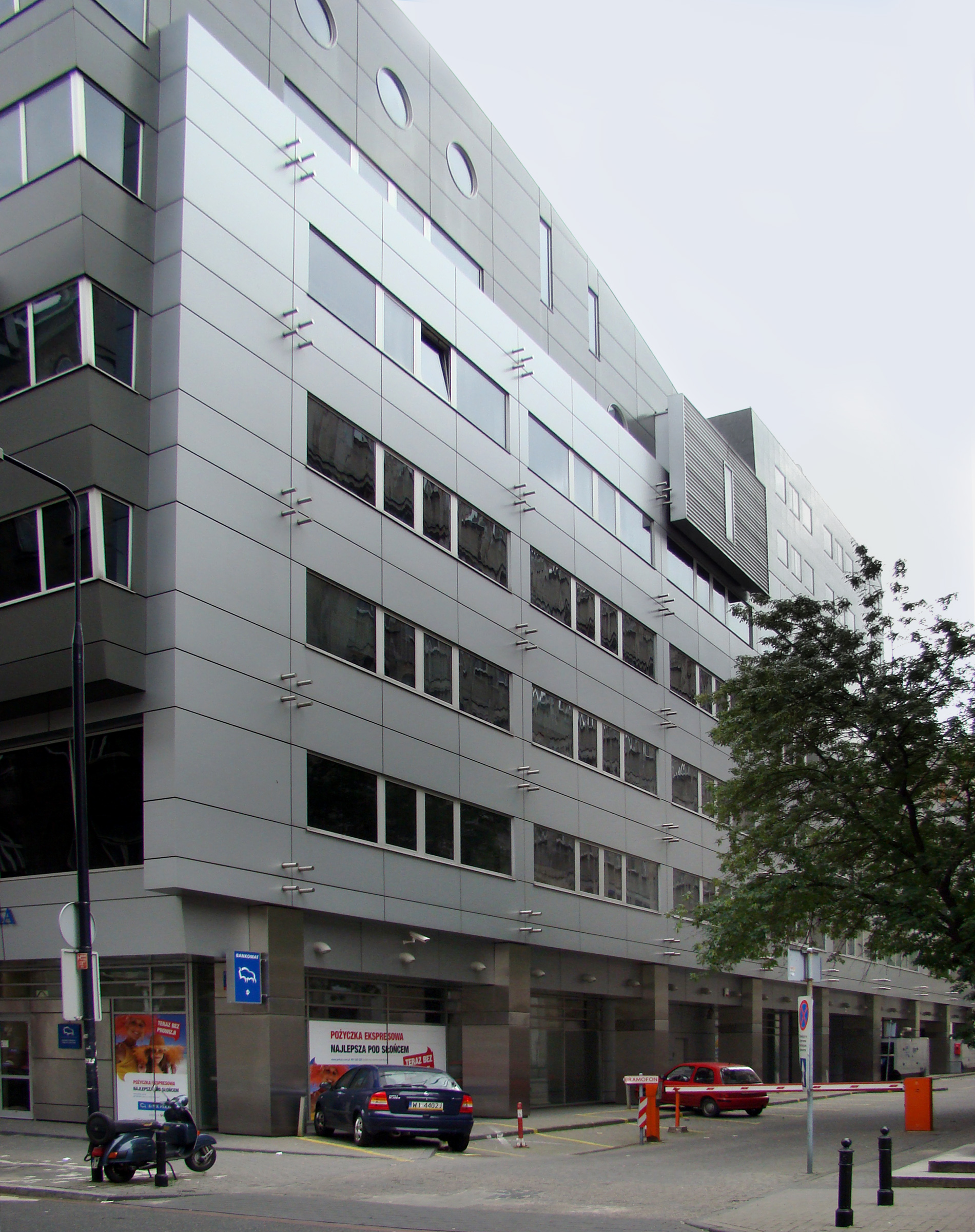
Building hosting the Honorary Consulate of Singapore in Warsaw

- Poland has an embassy in Singapore.
- Singapore has a non resident ambassador in Singapore. There is an honorary consulate of Singapore in Warsaw.

== See also ==
- Foreign relations of Poland
- Foreign relations of Singapore
