= Netherlands–Singapore relations =

- Singapore: Netherlands

Netherlands–Singapore relations refers to the bilateral relations between the Kingdom of the Netherlands and the Republic of Singapore. Upon Singapore's declaration of independence in August 1965, the Netherlands recognized Singapore as a sovereign state and established diplomatic relations with it, becoming one of the first European countries to do so. The Netherlands maintains its embassy in Singapore, while Singapore is represented in the Netherlands through its embassy in Brussels, Belgium.

== History ==
Trade relations between the Netherlands and Singapore began in the 19th century. In 1819, when Stamford Raffles founded Singapore, the Netherlands was dissatisfied, as it claimed Singapore was within its purview and wanted the United Kingdom to withdraw from Singapore. The United Kingdom did not withdraw and instead signed the Anglo-Dutch Treaty of 1824 with the Netherlands, through which the Netherlands recognized the occupation of the United Kingdom in Singapore.

In 1961, the government of Singapore appointed Albert Winsemius, a Dutch economist, to serve as Chief Economic Adviser until 1984. On August 9, 1965, Singapore was expelled by Malaysia and declared independence. The Netherlands established diplomatic relations with Singapore on December 7, 1965, becoming one of the first European countries to do so.

Between January 23 and 25, 2013, Queen Beatrix of the Netherlands visited Singapore and met with President Tony Tan and Prime Minister Lee Hsien Loong. During the state banquet, Tan stated, "Indeed, the Netherlands is not only one of Singapore's first friends, but also one of our most steadfast friends. Today, this friendship continues to endure and flourish, underpinned by our shared interests as small, outward-oriented and forward-looking countries". During the visit, the two sovereigns discussed ways to increase cooperation between the nations. The Netherlands promised to give strong support towards the free-trade agreement between Singapore and the European Union.

== Trade relations ==
The Netherlands was the most important trade partner of Singapore in the European Union in 2015. In 2015 it was reported that more than 1,000 Dutch companies have set up offices in Singapore, and nearly 100 Singaporean companies conduct their European operations through offices in the Netherlands. In 2009, the Netherlands was the second largest investor in Singapore, with investments totalling more than 50 billion Singapore dollars. Singaporean investments in the Netherlands totalled 3.1 billion Singapore dollars.

In 2012, Singapore exported products worth 4.68 billion US dollars to the Netherlands, while the Netherlands exported products worth 6.59 billion US dollars to Singapore. Products exported from Singapore to the Netherlands included chemical products, machines, and refined petroleum, while the Netherlands mainly exported refined petroleum to Singapore.

== Military relations ==
The Singapore Armed Forces and the Armed forces of the Netherlands cooperate through the organization of military training courses, joint visits, and professional exchanges.

The Royal Netherlands Navy commander, Vice Admiral Jan-Willem Kelder visited Singapore between January 16 and January 18, 2007. He met with Minister of Defence Teo Chee Hean and toured the Changi Naval Base.

== See also ==
- Foreign relations of the Netherlands
- Foreign relations of Singapore
