= List of diplomatic missions in Singapore =

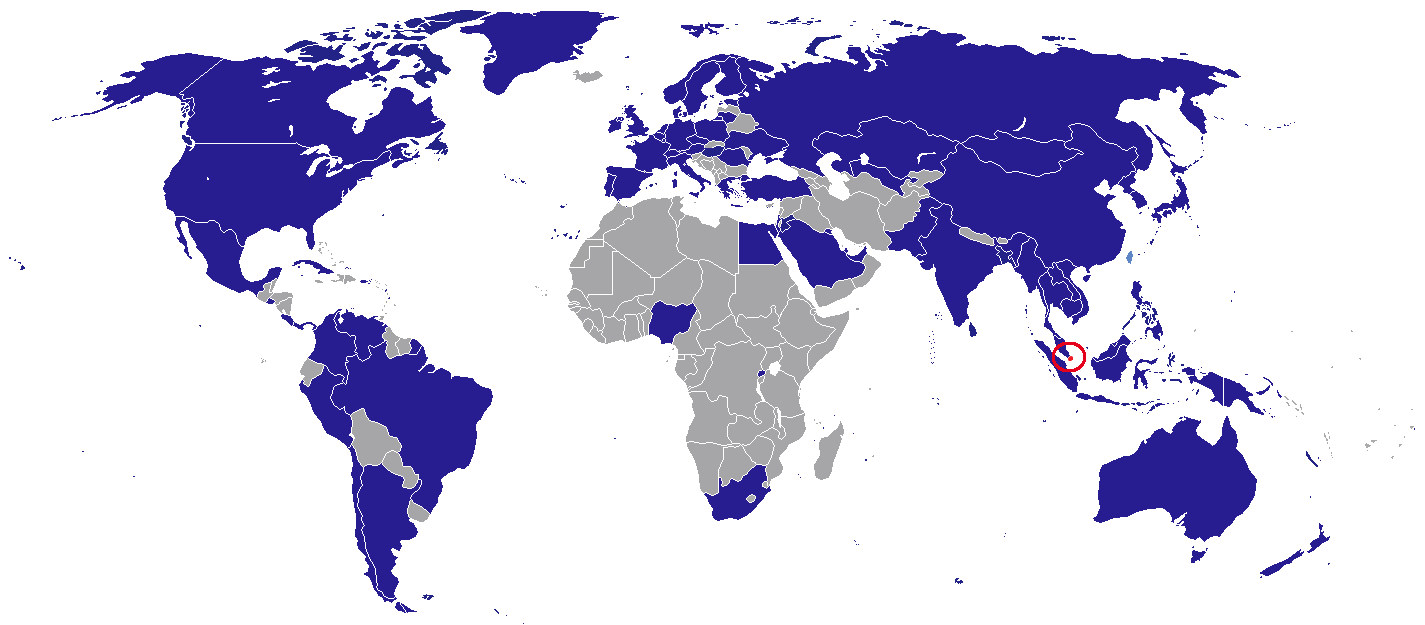
Map of diplomatic missions in Singapore

This list of diplomatic missions in Singapore is made up of 76 embassies/high commissions, several foreign consular posts and 11 international organisations.

Due to the high cost of land for rent in Singapore, many countries operate their embassies or high commissions in an office unit within a commercial building. Nevertheless, there are countries that have chanceries to house their missions, namely Australia, Brunei, China, France, India, Indonesia, Israel, Japan, Kuwait, Malaysia, Myanmar, Philippines, Russia, Switzerland, Thailand, United Kingdom, United States, and Vietnam.

Countries without any forms of diplomatic representations in Singapore have accredited non-resident ambassadors or high commissioners to the island city-state.

This listing does not include honorary consulates or trade offices.

== Resident foreign Embassies and High Commissions ==
Country	Address	Image	Website
Argentina	7 Temasek Boulevard, #15-03 Suntec Tower One		
Australia	25 Napier Road		
Austria	600 North Bridge Road, #24-04/05 Parkview Square		
Bangladesh	19 Keppel Road, #10-00 & #04-00 Jit Poh Building		
Belgium	79 Robinson Road, #25-01		
Brazil	101 Thomson Road, #29-01/03 United Square		
Brunei	325 Tanglin Road		
Cambodia	400 Orchard Road, #10-03/04 Orchard Towers		
Canada	One George Street, #11-01		
Chile	8 Temasek Boulevard, #24-01 Suntec Tower Three		
China	150 Tanglin Road		
Colombia	152 Beach Road, #03-04 Gateway East		
Costa Rica	896 Dunearn Road, #03-02B Sime Darby Centre		
Cuba	390 Havelock Road, #08-04 King's Centre		
Czech Republic	47 Scotts Road, #11-02/03 Goldbell Towers		
Denmark	101 Thomson Road, #13-01/02 United Square		
Egypt	8 Eu Tong Sen Street, #25-82/83/84/85/86 The Central		
El Salvador	10 Anson Road, International Plaza Building #18-12		
Estonia	260 Orchard Rd, #07-01 The Heeren		
Finland	101 Thomson Road, #21-03 United Square		
France	101-103 Cluny Park Road		
Germany	50 Raffles Place, #16-05 Singapore Land Tower		
Greece	47 Scotts Road, #06-03/04 Goldbell Towers		
Holy See	55 Waterloo Street, #09-01/02		
Hungary	250 North Bridge Road, #29-01 Raffles City Tower		
India	31 Grange Road		
Indonesia	7 Chatsworth Road		
Ireland	18 Cross Street, #13-04, Cross Street Exchange		
Israel	24 Stevens Close		
Italy	101 Thomson Road, #27-02 United Square		
Japan	16 Nassim Road		
Jordan	9 Temasek Boulevard, #15-01 Suntec Tower 2		
Kazakhstan	1 Kim Seng Promenade, #09-04/05 Great World City East Office Tower		
Kuwait	170 Bukit Timah Road		
Laos	51 Goldhill Plaza, #13-04/05 Goldhill Plaza		
Lithuania	18 Robinson Rd. #10-01		
Luxembourg	18 Robinson Rd. #06-00		
Malaysia	301 Jervois Road		
Maldives	101 Thomson Road, #30-01A United Square		
Mexico	152 Beach Road, #03-01/03 The Gateway East		
Mongolia	600 North Bridge Road, #24-08 Parkview Square		
Myanmar	15 St Martin's Drive		
Netherlands	541 Orchard Road, #13-01 Liat Towers		
New Zealand	One George Street, #21-04		
Nigeria	143 Cecil Street, #13-01 GB Building		
North Korea	1 North Bridge Road, #15-01 High Street Centre		
Norway	16 Raffles Quay, #44-01 Hong Leong Building		
Oman	600 North Bridge Road, #04–03/04/05 Parkview Square		
Pakistan	1 Scotts Road, #24-02/04 Shaw Centre		
Panama	16 Raffles Quay, #41-06 Hong Leong Building		
Papua New Guinea	1 Marine Parade Central, #08-05 Parkway Centre		
Peru	390 Orchard Road, #12-03 Palais Renaissance		
Philippines	TripleOne Somerset Building, 111 Somerset Rd		
Poland	435 Orchard Road, #17-02/03 Wisma Atria		
Portugal	3 Killiney Road, #05-08, Winsland House I		
Qatar	8 Temasek Boulevard, #41-02 Suntec Tower Three		
Romania	1 Claymore Drive, #08-10 Orchard Towers		
Russia	51 Nassim Road		
Rwanda	8 Temasek Boulevard, #14-03 Suntec Tower Three		
Saudi Arabia	163 Penang Road, #03-01/02/03 Winsland House II		
South Africa	331 North Bridge Road, #15-01/06 Odeon Towers		
South Korea	47 Scotts Road, #08-00 Goldbell Towers		
Spain	7 Temasek Boulevard, #39-00 Suntec Tower One		
Sri Lanka	51 Newton Road, #13-07/12 Goldhill Plaza		
Sweden	1 Temasek Avenue, #14-03 Millenia Tower		
Switzerland	1 Swiss Club Link		
Thailand	370 Orchard Road		
Timor-Leste	140 Robinson Road, #09-04/05 Crown @ Robinson		
Turkey	2 Shenton Way, #10-03 SGX Centre 1		
Ukraine	50 Raffles Place, #16-05 Singapore Land Tower		
United Arab Emirates	600 North Bridge Road, #09-01 Parkview Square		
United Kingdom	100 Tanglin Road		
United States	27 Napier Road		
Uzbekistan	20 Kramat Lane, #04-01 United House		
Venezuela	3 Killiney Road, #07-03 Winsland House I		
Vietnam	10 Leedon Park		

== Missions in Singapore ==
Country	Address	Image	Website
European Union	250 North Bridge Road, #38-03 Raffles City Tower		
Hong Kong	9 Temasek Boulevard, #34-01, Suntec Tower Two		
Quebec	2, Shenton Way, SGX Centre 1, #10-02		
Republic of China (Taiwan)	460 Alexandra Road, #23-00, PSA Building		

== Multinational organisations ==
- Asia-Europe Foundation
- Asia-Pacific Economic Cooperation
- International Monetary Fund (IMF)
- IMF - Singapore Regional Training Institute
- Japan International Cooperation Agency
- Pacific Economic Cooperation Council
- World Health Organization
- Multilateral Investment Guarantee Agency (MIGA)
- ReCAAP Information Sharing Centre (ISC)
- Regional Emerging Diseases Intervention (REDI) Center
- World Intellectual Property Organization
- World Bank

== Accredited non-resident embassies and high commissions ==
=== Resident in Bangkok, Thailand ===
- Bahrain
- Bhutan
- Nepal

=== Resident in Beijing, China ===
- Bahamas
- Botswana
- Comoros
- Congo-Brazzaville
- Gabon
- Guinea-Bissau
- Guyana
- Kyrgyzstan
- Lesotho
- Malawi
- Niger
- Sierra Leone
- Suriname

=== Resident in New Delhi, India ===
- Burundi
- Congo-Kinshasa
- Eritrea
- Jamaica
- Mauritius
- North Macedonia
- Tajikistan
- Trinidad and Tobago
- Uganda
- Zambia

=== Resident in Jakarta, Indonesia ===
- Afghanistan
- Algeria
- Armenia
- Azerbaijan
- Belarus
- Bosnia & Herzegovina
- Bulgaria
- Croatia
- Cyprus
- Ecuador
- Ethiopia
- Fiji
- Georgia
- Guatemala
- Iraq
- Kenya
- Libya
- Morocco
- Mozambique
- Serbia
- Slovakia
- Somalia
- Sudan
- Tanzania
- Tunisia
- Yemen
- Zimbabwe

=== Resident in Tokyo, Japan ===
- Albania
- Benin
- Burkina Faso
- Djibouti
- Dominican Republic
- Ghana
- Guinea
- Ivory Coast
- Liberia
- Madagascar
- Mauritania
- Micronesia

=== Resident in Seoul, South Korea ===
- Paraguay
- Senegal
- Slovenia
- Turkmenistan

=== Resident elsewhere ===
- Eswatini (Mbabane)
- Iceland (Reykjavík)
- Iran (Tehran)
- Latvia (Riga)
- Malta (Valletta)
- Marshall Islands (Taipei)
- Nicaragua (Hanoi)
- Samoa (Canberra)
- Tonga (Canberra)
- Uruguay (Hanoi)

== Former embassies and high commissions ==
- Bulgaria (date unknown)
- Angola (closed 2024)
- Ecuador (closed 2014) (Note: Resident in Jakarta, Indonesia)
- SFR Yugoslavia (Note: A Croatian, Bosnian and Serbian resident in Jakarta, Indonesia. A Slovenian resident in Seoul, South Korea.)

== Mission to open ==
- Saint Kitts and Nevis

== See also ==
- List of diplomatic missions of Singapore
- Foreign relations of Singapore
- Visa policy of Singapore
- Visa requirements for Singaporean citizens
