= Goldhill Plaza =

Building complex in Novena, Singapore

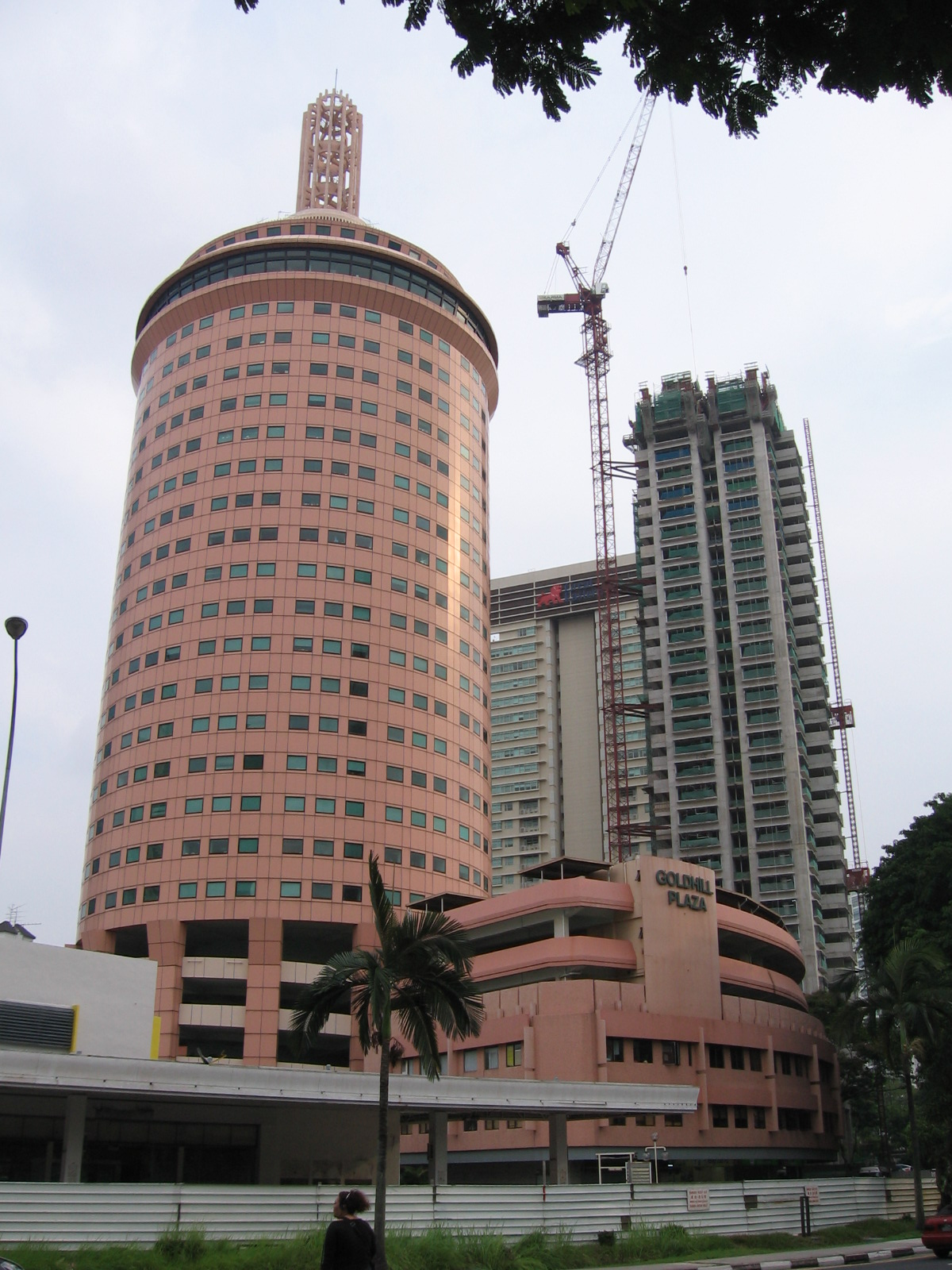
- Goldhill Plaza in 2006.
- Interactive map of the Goldhill Plaza area

General information
- Location: 1 (shopping mall)/51 (office tower) Goldhill Plaza Singapore 308899
- Coordinates: 1.3181°N 103.8427°E
- Completed: November 1972
- Owner: Undisclosed Indonesian Company

Technical details
- Floor count: 24 (office tower) 5 (podium)

Design and construction
- Architect: Yang Tai Tye
- Architecture firm: Eric Cumine & Associates (consultant architects)

Other information
- Parking: Yes
- Public transit: NS20 Novena

Goldhill Plaza is an office and shopping complex at the junction of Newton Road and Khiang Guan Avenue in Novena, Singapore. Developed by Goldhill Properties in 1972, it comprises two connected blocks, a 24-storey cylindrical office tower, which was the "first of its kind" in the country, and a five-storey crescent-shaped podium which houses shops, restaurants, offices and a carpark on its upper floors.

The building initially enjoyed an "excellent" occupancy rate despite its higher rent. The success of the complex led to the development of the nearby Goldhill Square, now known as United Square. By the early 1980s, the complex began to suffer from the vacation of several of its units. However, the complex recovered in the second half of the decade. In 1989, it was acquired by an Indonesian company after less than a week of negotiations. The deal was Goldhill founder William Goei's last before his retirement from the company.

== History ==
=== Planning and construction ===
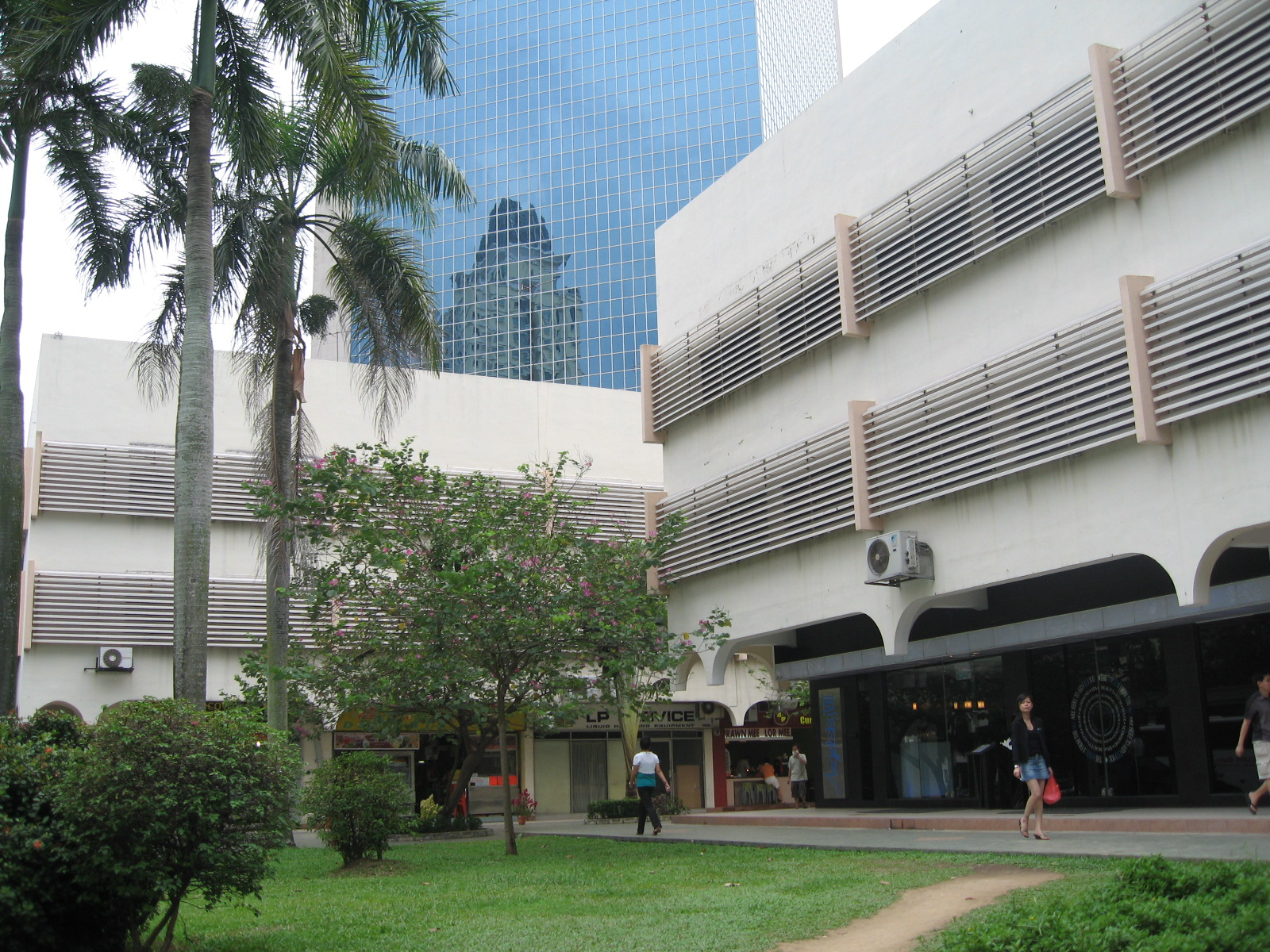
The nearby Goldhill Shopping Centre.

At the end of 1969, Goldhill Properties announced that they were "shortly" to commence construction on an office and shopping complex named Goldhill Plaza, which was to "set a new high standard for commercial properties in Singapore." It was to "provide an opportunity for business houses to own their own offices instead of renting office space." The complex, comprising a podium and an office tower, was to be located at what was then the junction of Newton Road and Thomson Road, within an area which had recently been rezoned as commercial. It was to be situated next to another property developed by Goldhill, the Goldhill Shopping Centre, which had been completed in 1969.

Construction was to take place in two parts, with work on the tower only beginning after the completion of the podium. The Straits Times reported that work on the podium was to begin toward the end of that year and finish around a year later. The complex as a whole was to be complete by 1972. It was then estimated that the project would cost $15 million to build. Designed by local architect Yang Tai Tye, the 26-storey complex, to stand at a height of 250 ft, was to comprise two blocks. The first was to be a five-storey podium, with the ground floor housing 24 retail units and the first and second floors housing 48 office units. The third and fourth floors, as well as the rooftop, were to be occupied by a carpark with a capacity for 300 vehicles. In addition, there was to be a restaurant on the first floor. The shopfronts, floors and ceilings were to feature "architectural unity". The second block was to be a cylindrical 21-storey office tower resting on the podium with around 100,000 sq ft of floor space in total. The appearance of the tower was reportedly designed to evoke the image of the Colosseum. The consultant architects for the project were Eric Cumine & Associates. The two blocks were to be connected and serviced by lifts and escalators.

=== Opening and initial success ===
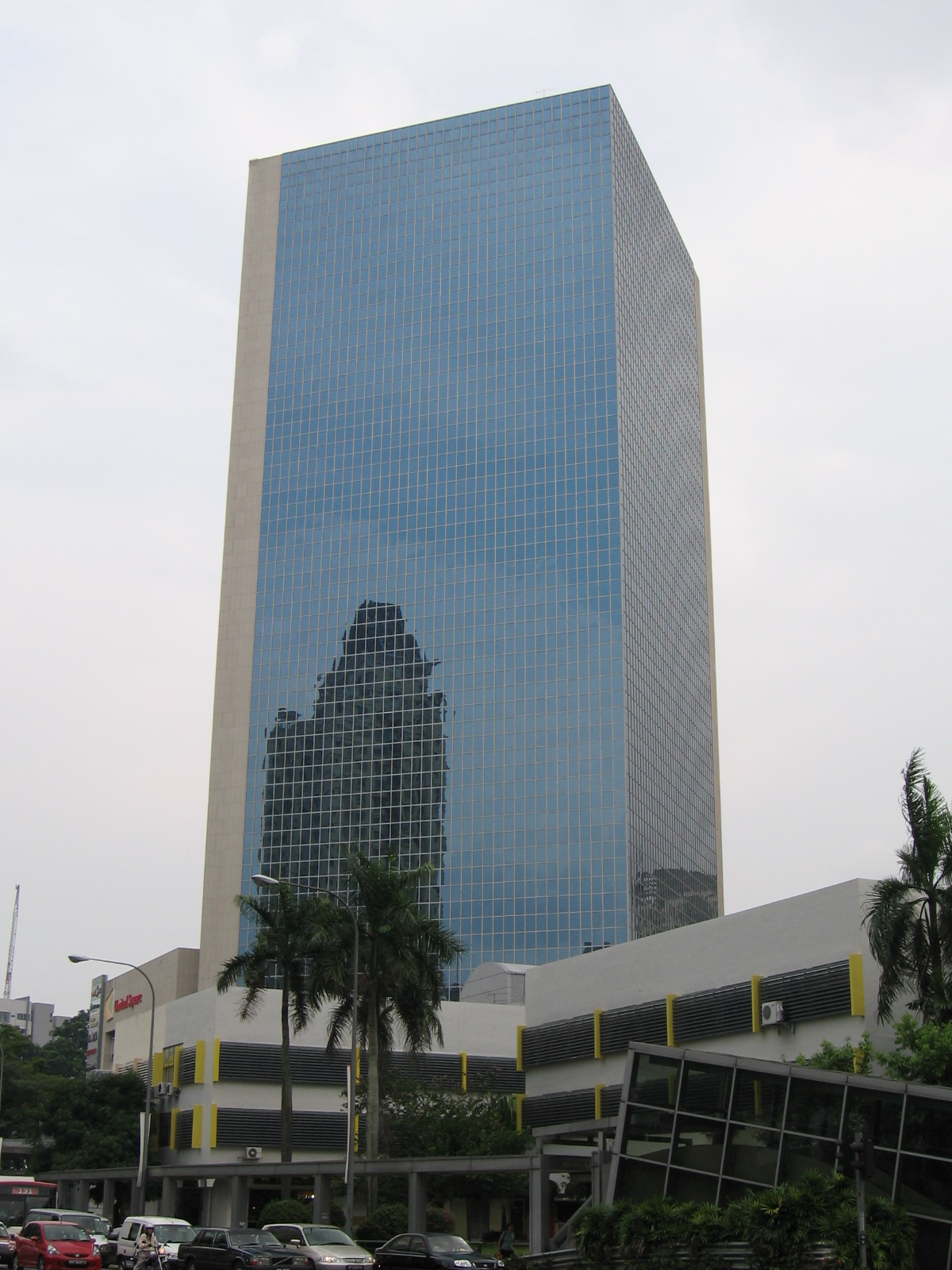
Goldhill Square, now known as United Square, was developed in response to the complex's early success.

In February 1972, the offices of the Italian Trade Office in Singapore were moved into the building, where it remained for seven years before relocating to what was then known as the World Trade Centre. Chung Shuan Motors, which retailed Datsun vehicles, moved its offices and opened a "million-dollar" showroom at the complex in July. The Chez Beppi restaurant, which served Italian cuisine, opened in the restaurant's ground floor in October. Food critic Wendy Hutton of the New Nation called its establishment a "welcome event" as the "standard of Western food available here [was] generally way below that of Asian food." The complex as a whole was complete and ready for occupation by November. It was 24-storeys-tall as a whole, with the tower having 18 floors of offices. In the same month, it was announced that real estate firm City Developments Limited had agreed to acquire the complex for $12.9 million. This was the "most important" of the three major acquisitions made by the company in that month, with the others being that of the Palace Theatre and 240 acres of land in Plentong, Malaysia.

In January 1973, a 49ft by 18ft wall sculpture by Filipino sculptor Eduardo Castrillo, titled The Rise of the Knitted Society, was installed in the complex. Made of concrete, bronze dust and brass, it depicted various aspects of "Singapore's environment of the present and future." Singapore Motors Pte. Ltd. also opened a car showroom at the mall in July. Another tenant of the complex then were the head offices of the British Overseas Airways Corporation in Singapore. In October 1977, The Business Times reported that the complex had an "excellenct occupancy rate" despite higher rent, and that this "[was] testimony to the 'popularity' of office blocks outside the CBD." Goldhill Properties announced in response its success that they were to develop another office and shopping complex, Plaza III, next to Goldhill Plaza. The new complex was renamed Goldhill Square and was completed in 1982. By June 1979, the High Commission of Sri Lanka in Singapore had moved into the 12th floor of the tower. French chef Bernard Sautereau opened the Le Bernardin "French bistro" restaurant in the podium block in October 1982. It was a simpler version of his previous restaurant at the Hyatt Regency Singapore, Hugo's.

The Business Times reported in November 1983 that the complex had "not been faring well", as several of its tenants had vacated the complex. Additionally, there were suggestions that the complex had been "unsuccessfully offered for sale to local buyers." In January 1986, the Australian Tourist Commission moved its regional offices into the complex from its former, smaller premises at the Shaw Centre. This was part of a move by the commission to "market itself more aggressively to the world as a tourist destination." The Novena MRT station opened across the street from the complex in 1987. In the same year, a Malaysian company acquired two of the office tower's floors from Goldhill for $5.85 million. Lee Han Shih of The Business Times noted that the floors were sold at a price "comparable to that fetched" in the sale of the Robinson Centre on Shenton Way. Following the sale, Goldhill continued to own 16 floors. In the late 1980s, Parkway Holdings sought to acquire the complex for $600 psf. However, this deal "fell through at the last minute".

=== 1989 acquisition ===
The complex was sold to an "unnamed Indonesian company", whose identity Goldhill declined to reveal, for $93 million in May 1989 after a week of negotiations. The tower and podium cost $85.89 million and $7.19 million, respectively. Both parties first met on 15 May, met again three days later, and the deal was signed on 22 May. Lee reported that the speed at which the deal had gone through was "considered something of a record", as the "only comparable deal" in the country was the sale of the Paragon mall on Orchard Road to the United Industrial Corporation, which took place after two days of negotiations. He noted that $93 million was "substantially higher than the rates discussed" between Goldhill and Parkway Holdings. The deal was the "swan song" of Goldhill head William Goei, who was to retire afterwards. In June, SBC Enterprise, the "commercial arm" of the Singapore Broadcasting Corporation, comprising around 100 employees, had its offices temporarily moved into the 23rd floor of the complex. There were then plans to move the rest of the corporation into the tower temporarily, with the administrative section, comprising another 100 employees, moving in the month after. Supermarket company Cold Storage opened a $250,000 training centre at the complex for all of its employees in October 1992.

By February 2008, rent at the building was reportedly "single-digit" per sq ft. In contrast, rent in surrounding, more recently built complexes, such as the renovated Goldhill Square, now United Square, and Novena Square, was then around 10.50 to $11.50 per sq ft. By 2019, the Embassy of the Lao People's Democratic Republic in Singapore had moved into the office tower. In September 2022, Pailin Boonlong of Time Out magazine wrote: "Not much seems to go on in Goldhill Plaza – it's one of those age-old landmarks that've stood in Novena for what seems like eons." However, she noted that several of the complex's restaurants were popular and had "made a strong name for themselves". Scenes from the music video of the 2025 pop song Don't Say You Love Me, which showcased "landmarks and hidden gems" in Singapore, were filmed on the rooftop of the complex's carpark.
