= Singapore–Taiwan relations =

Singapore–Republic of China (Taiwan) relations
- Singapore: Taiwan

Diplomatic mission
- Singapore Trade Office in Taipei: Taipei Representative Office in Singapore

Singapore–Republic of China (Taiwan) relations (Chinese: 中華民國—新加坡關係; Malay: Hubungan Singapura–Republik China; Tamil: சிங்கப்பூர்–சீன குடியரசு உறவுகள்) are the international relations between Singapore and Taiwan, formally the Republic of China (ROC). Singapore was the last country in Southeast Asia to maintain recognition of the ROC as the representative of China, before establishing diplomatic relations with the People's Republic of China in 1990. Nevertheless, Singapore and Taiwan continue to share cordial relations, particularly through cultural exchanges and military cooperation. Both countries are members of the World Trade Organization (WTO).

== Early history ==
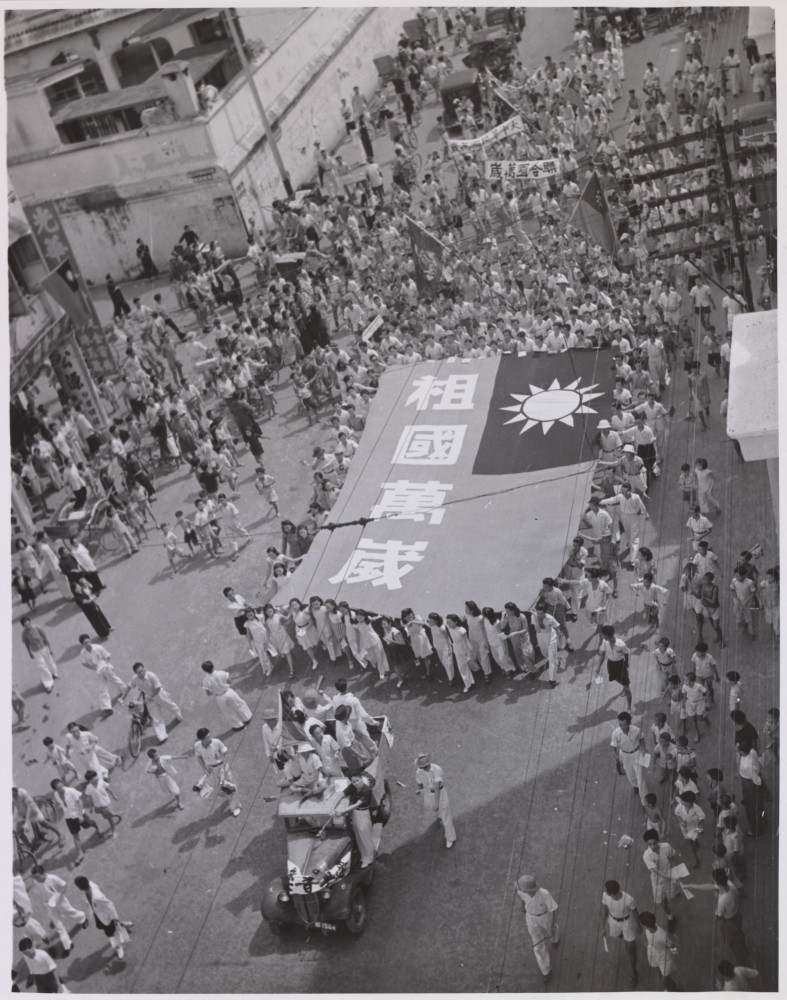
Chinese Singaporeans celebrating the surrender of Japan with a ROC flag on 15 August 1945

The Nationalist government's retreat to Taipei

The island of Taiwan was known to the Europeans as Formosa. In 1662, Koxinga (Zheng Chenggong), a Ming loyalist, expelled the Dutch and established the first Han Chinese regime in Taiwan. Qing dynasty annexed Taiwan in 1684 after Ming loyalists surrendered to the Qing. In 1895, Qing ceded the island of Taiwan to the Japan for the defeat in the First Sino-Japanese War. While Taiwan was under Japanese rule, the Republic of China was founded on mainland China in 1912, overthrowing the Qing dynasty. After World War II, Japan surrendered Taiwan to the Republic of China. In 1949, the Kuomintang-led government of the Republic of China lost in the Chinese Civil War and retreated to Taiwan.

Singapore was under British colonial rule until it attained self-government in 1959. During the colonial period, the ROC maintained official representation in Singapore through its consulate-general. Following the establishment of the People's Republic of China (PRC) in 1949, the United Kingdom recognised the PRC as the government of China on 6 January 1950. The ROC subsequently terminated its official diplomatic representation in Singapore.

The ROC later re-established an unofficial presence in Singapore on 6 March 1969 with the establishment of the "Trade Mission of the Republic of China" which was renamed as the Taipei Representative Office in Singapore after Singapore establish ties with the PRC on 8 August 1990. The Taipei Representative Office serves as the de facto diplomatic mission of Taiwan in Singapore.

== 1965–2010 ==
When Singapore became independent in 1965 from Malaysia, it continued in recognising the Republic of China (ROC) as the legitimate government of China. In the 1970s, the People's Republic of China (PRC) and Singapore began unofficial relations, although Singapore continued to recognise the ROC as the legitimate China. Since the independence of Singapore and the establishment of Kuomintang (KMT) rule over the island of Taiwan, the Singapore Armed Forces (SAF) adopted military training bases in Taiwan from 1975 that included combined arms exercises involving infantry, artillery, and armoured units. The then Prime Minister of Singapore Lee Kuan Yew also appointed military personnel in logistics training.

On 3 October 1990, Singapore revised diplomatic relations from ROC to PRC. The relationship between Singapore and the PRC has since improved significantly although good relations with the ROC are still maintained.

In 2009, the Singapore Trade Office in Taipei was honoured for its role in developing close economic ties between the two sides. Taiwan is Singapore's ninth largest trading partner, with bilateral trade topping S$35 billion in 2008.

=== 2004 Lee Hsien Loong visit to Taiwan ===
In 2004, shortly before Lee Hsien Loong assumed office as Prime Minister of Singapore from Goh Chok Tong, he visited Taiwan to familiarise himself with recent developments there. The visit drew criticism from China, which warned Singaporean officials of negative consequences should they make high-profile visits to Taiwan in the future. In his maiden National Day Rally speech, Lee noted to the Taiwanese leadership and populace, cautioning that they might be overestimating the level of international support they would receive should Taiwan declare independence. Conversely in September, Singapore Foreign Minister George Yeo cautioned the United Nations General Assembly about the dangers of letting the cross-strait relationship deteriorate.

== 2010 onwards ==
In bilateral trade, from 2010 till 2012, former Taiwanese vice-president Lien Chan announced talks between Taiwan and Singapore on a proposed economic partnership agreement. Finalised 7 November 2013, Taiwan and Singapore signed an economic partnership agreement called the Agreement between Singapore and the Separate Customs Territory of Taiwan, Penghu, Kinmen and Matsu on Economic Partnership (ASTEP) in Singapore in significantly reducing tariffs imposed by Taiwan on goods imported from Singapore. This is Taiwan's first economic partnership agreement signed with a member of ASEAN.

The Taipei Ministry of Foreign Affairs reassigned Vice Foreign Minister Vanessa Shih back after she reportedly angered Lee Kuan Yew and other high-ranking officials with a series of actions including singing the Republic of China (ROC) national anthem and raising the national flag at a public reception celebrating the ROC centennial, as well as making contact with Chen Show Mao, a member of the opposition Workers’ Party.

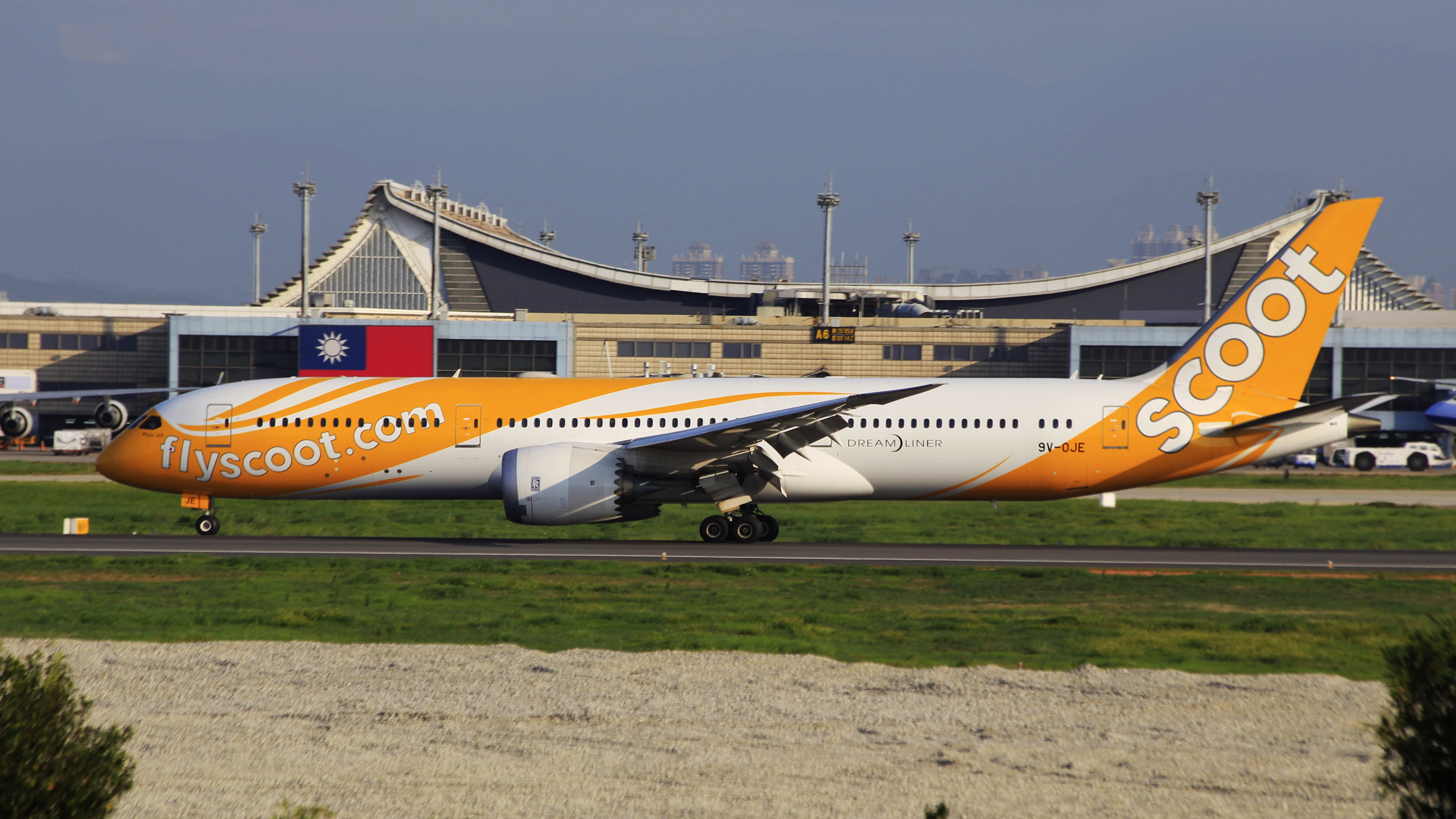
Singapore airliner Scoot in Taiwan

On 24 March 2015 Taiwan President Ma Ying-jeou made a low-profile day-trip visit to Singapore to pay tribute to late former Prime Minister of Singapore Lee Kuan Yew. Ma's visit came after an invitation from Singapore Prime Minister Lee Hsien Loong for the private family wake at the official residence of the Prime Minister in Ma's capacity as Lee Kuan Yew's "old friend".

Taiwanese leader Ma Ying-jeou and Chinese leader Xi Jinping met on 7 November 2015 in Singapore.

On 4 November 2021, Defense Minister Ng Eng Hen described Taiwan's political status as an issue that for the People's Republic of China, "goes to the heart of the political legitimacy of the leader, of the party of the party and it's a deep red line. I can think of no scenario which there are winners if there is an actual physical confrontation over Taiwan ... So, I would advise us to stay very far away from that."

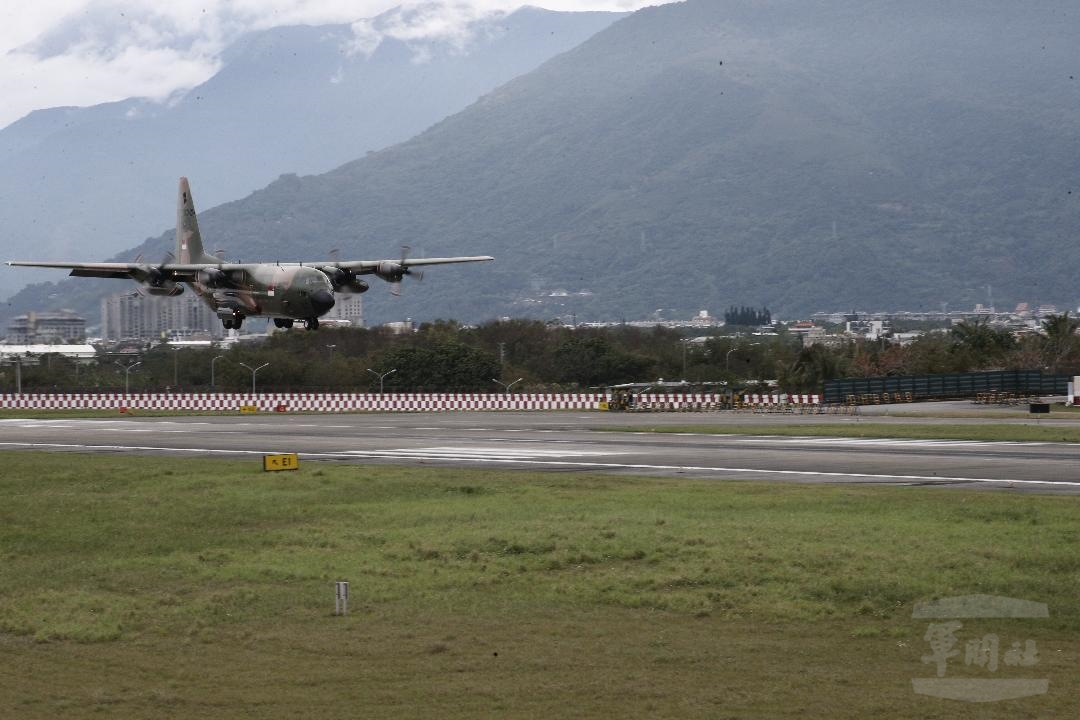
Humanitarian aid sent by a C-130 Hercules of the Republic of Singapore Air Force (RSAF) to Hualien Airport, Taiwan during the 2018 Hualien earthquake.

== Military relations ==
In 1975, Premier Chiang Ching-kuo and Lee Kuan Yew signed an agreement codenamed Project Starlight (星光計畫, also known as Hsing Kuang), wherein Singapore Armed Forces (SAF) troops would be sent to Taiwan for training and joint exercises. These exercises, engaging as many as 10,000 troops at any one time, provided officers a chance to simulate wartime conditions more closely and gain experience in the command and control of operations involving several battalions. Three military bases in Taiwan were used by the SAF.

== Resident diplomatic missions ==
of Singapore in Taiwan

- Taipei (Trade Office)

of Taiwan in Singapore

- Singapore (Representative Office)

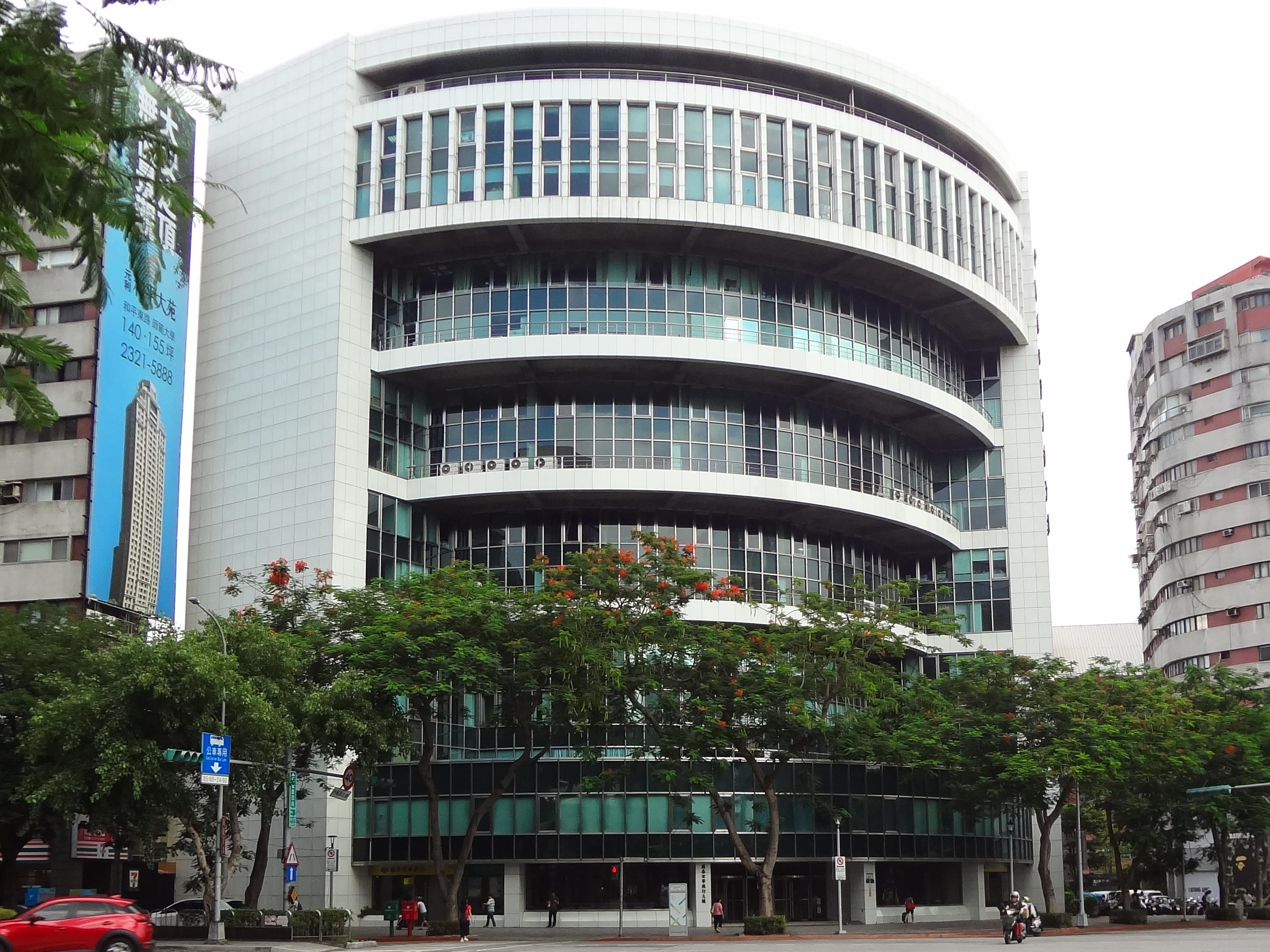
Building hosting the Singapore Trade Office in Taipei

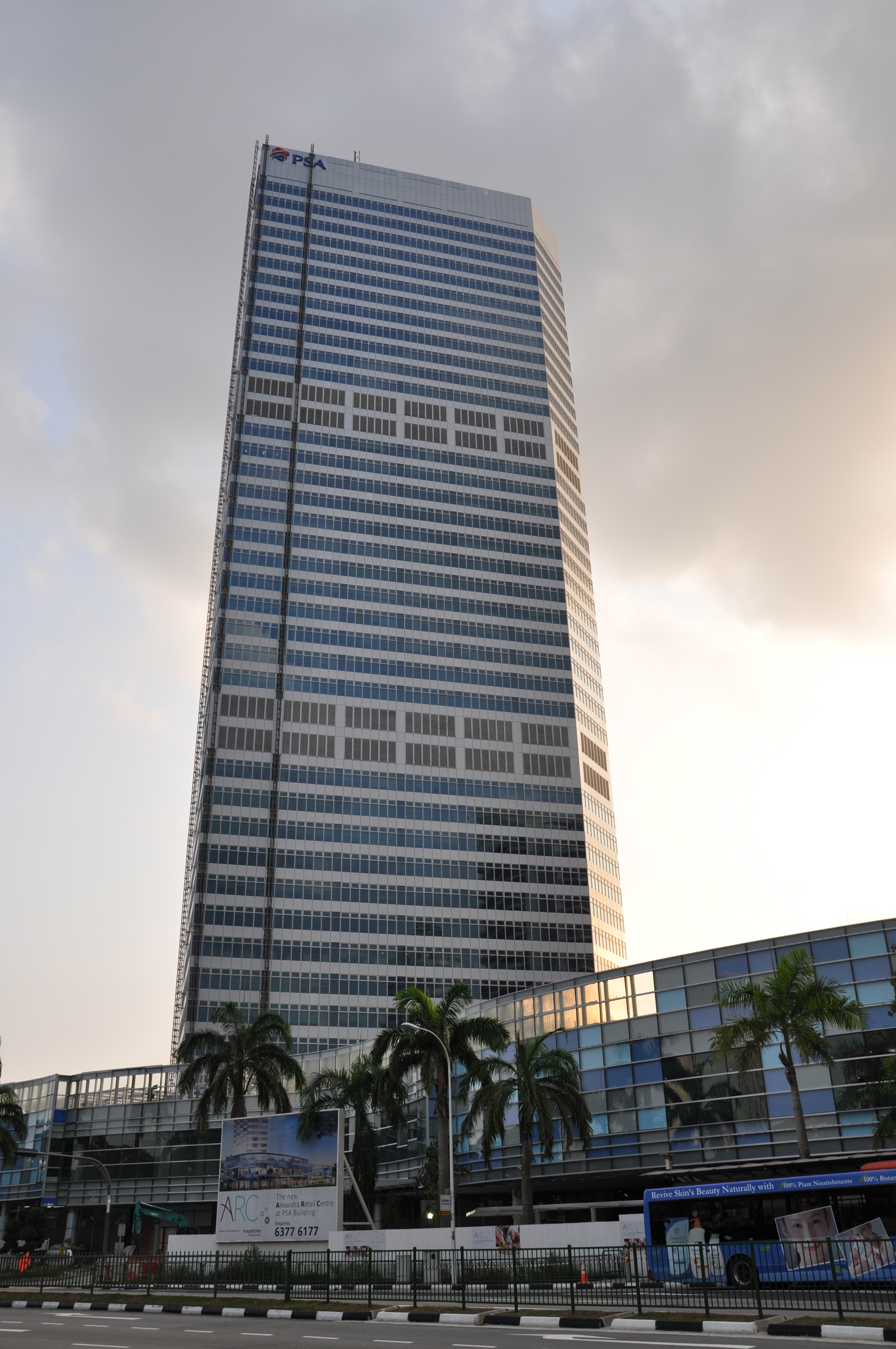
Building hosting the Taipei Representative Office in Singapore

== See also ==
- Foreign relations of Taiwan
- Foreign relations of Singapore
- Bamboo network
