= Singapore Trade Office, Taipei =

Political representative office in Da'an, Taipei, Taiwan

Coordinates: 25°02′18″N 121°32′52″E

Singapore Trade Office in Taipei
- 新加坡駐臺北商務辦事處
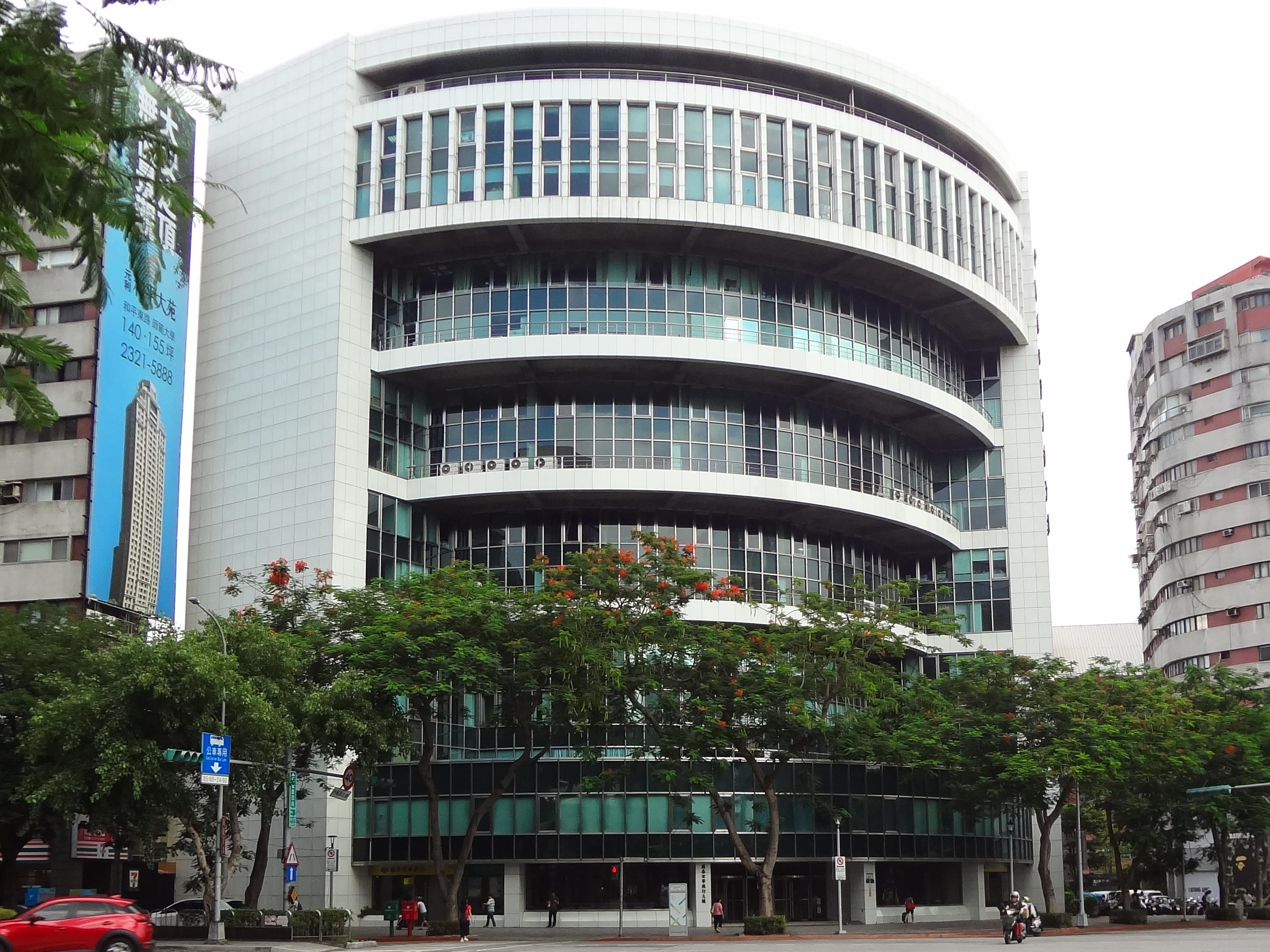
- Cathay United Bank Tower where the Singapore Trade Office is located.

Agency overview
- Formed: 1979 (as Trade Representative Office); 1990 (as Singapore Trade Office)
- Jurisdiction: Republic of China
- Headquarters: Da'an, Taipei, Taiwan
- Agency executive: Foo Teow Lee, Trade Representative
- Website: Singapore Trade Office in Taipei

The Singapore Trade Office in Taipei (Chinese: 新加坡駐臺北商務辦事處; pinyin: Xīnjiāpō Zhù Táiběi Shāngwù Bànshì Chù; Pe̍h-ōe-jī: Sin-ka-pho chù Tâi-pak Siong-bū Pān-sū-chhù) is the representative office of Singapore in Taiwan located in Da'an District, Taipei, Taiwan.

It was first established in 1979 as the Trade Representative Office, before adopting its present name in 1990. The first trade representative was William Cheng.

Its counterpart body in Singapore is the Taipei Representative Office in Singapore.

== Mission ==
To safeguard the interests of Singaporeans visiting, living, studying and working in Taiwan, and to promote economic and cultural links between Singapore and Taiwan.

== Transportation ==
The office is accessible within walking distance south west of Zhongxiao Dunhua Station of the Taipei Metro.

== See also ==
- Singapore–Taiwan relations
- Taipei Representative Office in Singapore
- List of diplomatic missions in Taiwan
- List of diplomatic missions of Singapore
