= Taipei Representative Office, Singapore =

Political representative office in Singapore

Coordinates: 1.273575°N 103.801214°E

Taipei Representative Office in Singapore 駐新加坡台北代表處
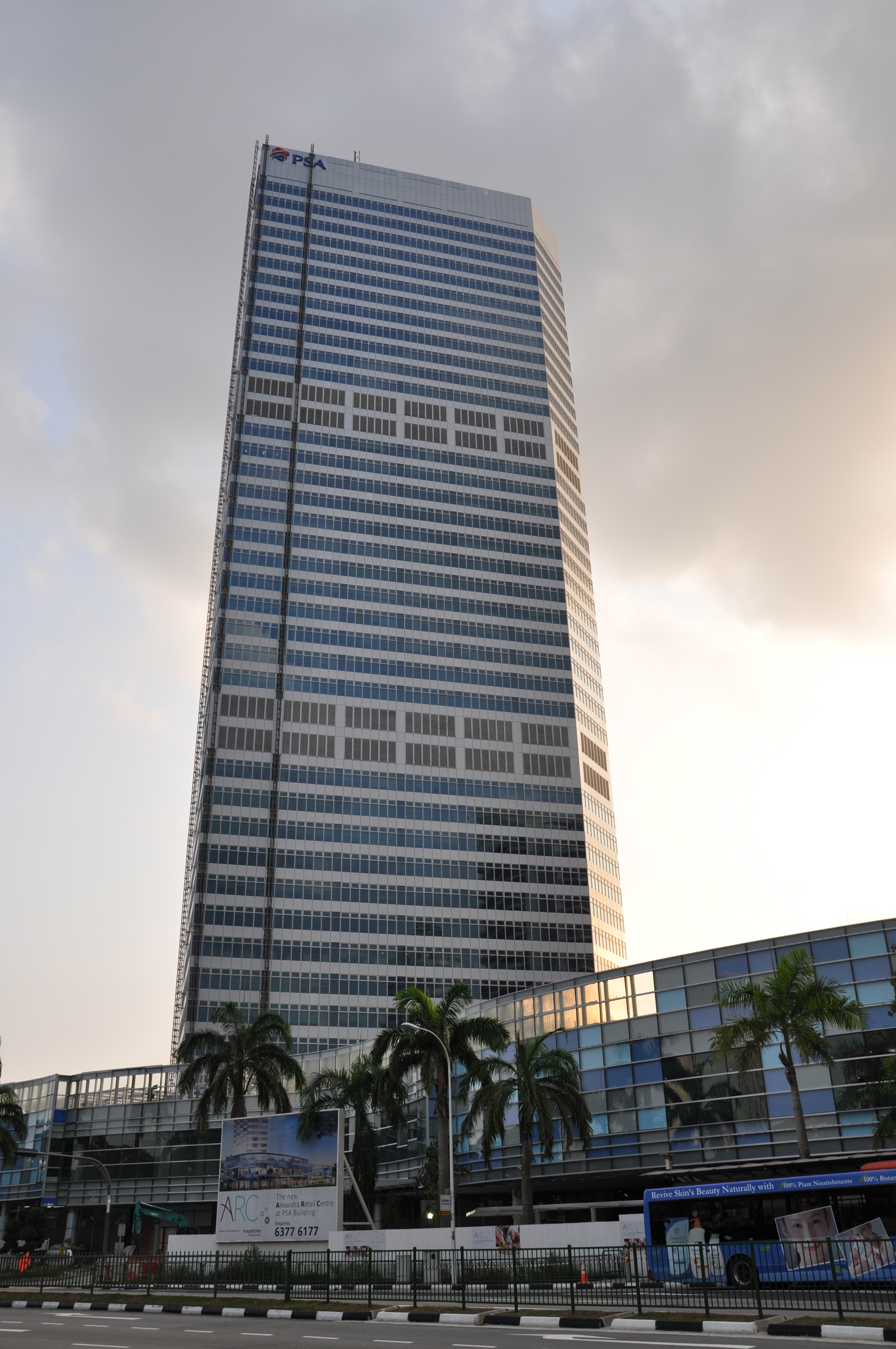
- mTower (PSA Building)

Agency overview
- Formed: 1969 (as Trade Mission of the Republic of China); 1990 (as Taipei Representative Office in Singapore)
- Jurisdiction: Singapore
- Headquarters: 460 Alexandra Road #23-00, Singapore
- Agency executive: Tung Chen-yuan, Representative
- Website: www.taiwanembassy.org/sg_en

The Taipei Representative Office in Singapore (TRO; Chinese: 駐新加坡台北代表處; pinyin: Zhù Xīnjiāpō Táiběi Dàibiǎo Chù) is the representative office of the Republic of China in Singapore. Its counterpart body in Taiwan is the Singapore Trade Office in Taipei.

The office is located within mTower at 460 Alexandra Road, Singapore.

== History ==
The office was originally established in March 1969 as Trade Mission of the Republic of China, but it adopted its present name in September 1990, following Singapore's establishment of diplomatic relations with the People's Republic of China.

== Divisions ==
- Consular Division
- Information Division
- Economic Division
- Tourism Division

== Representatives ==
- Chiang Hsiao-wu
- Vanessa Shih (2009 – May 2012)
- Hsieh Fa-dah (May 2012 – 25 July 2015)
- Jacob Chang (25 July 2015 – 19 May 2016)
- Antonio Chiang (2 August 2016 – 9 August 2016)
- Francis Liang (14 November 2016 – 7 May 2023)
- Tung Chen-yuan (8 May 2023 – )

== Transportation ==
TRO is accessible within a short walking distance from Labrador Park MRT station.

== See also ==
- Singapore–Taiwan relations
- List of diplomatic missions of Taiwan
- List of diplomatic missions in Singapore
- Taipei Economic and Cultural Representative Office
