= One George Street =

Office skyscraper in Singapore

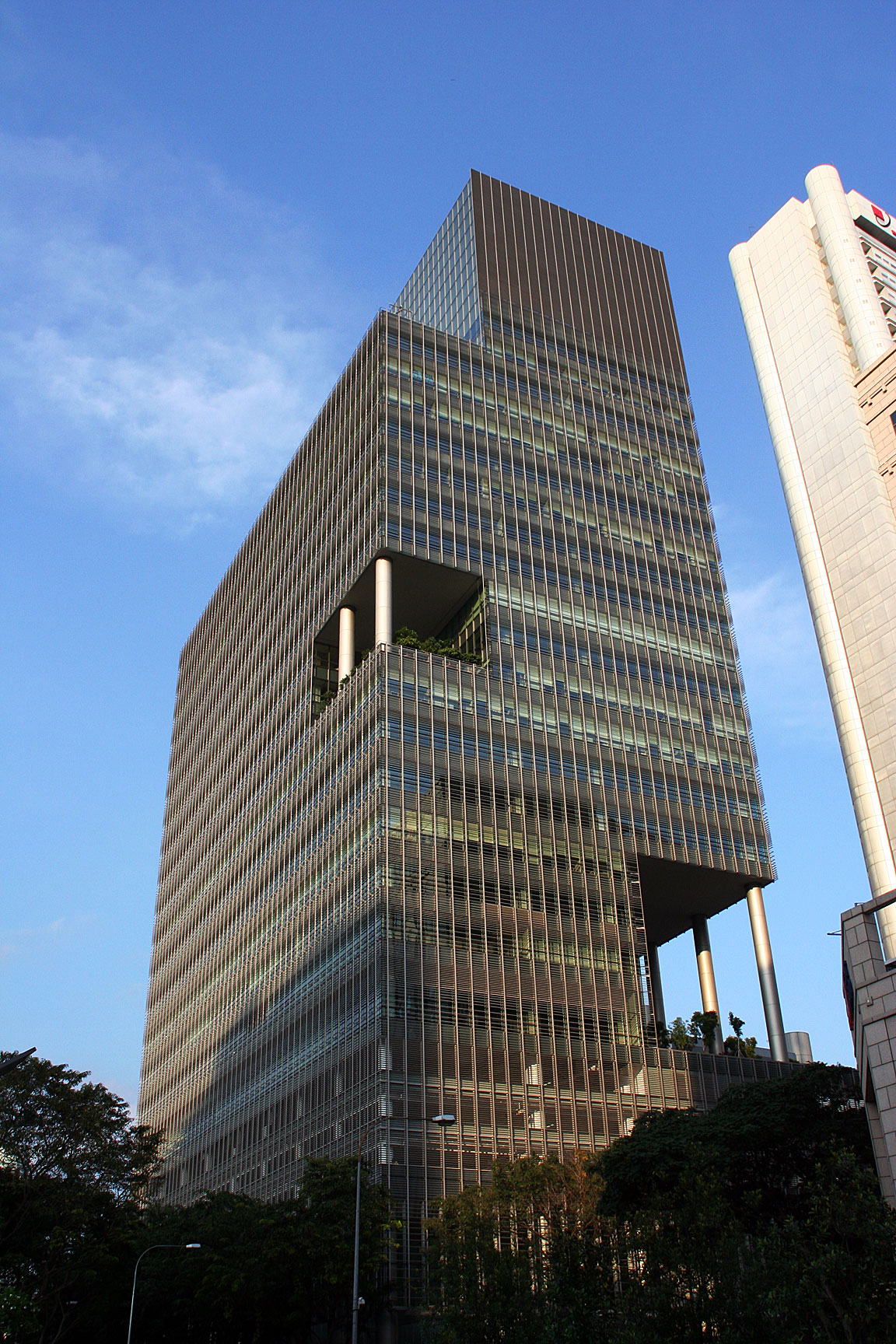
- Interactive map of the One George Street area

General information
- Status: Completed
- Type: Commercial offices
- Architectural style: Modernism
- Location: Raffles Place, Downtown Core, Singapore, 1 George Street, Singapore 049145
- Coordinates: 1.2858°N 103.8477°E
- Construction started: 2003; 23 years ago
- Completed: 2004; 22 years ago
- Cost: $117,142,992
- Owner: SG OGS Pte Ltd
- Operator: SG OGS Pte Ltd

Height
- Roof: 153 m (502 ft)

Technical details
- Floor count: 23
- Floor area: 51,713.5 m^{2} (556,639 sq ft)

Design and construction
- Architects: Skidmore, Owings and Merrill; DCA Architects
- Developer: One George Street Pte Ltd (CapitaLand and ERGO)
- Main contractor: Kajima Overseas Asia Pte Ltd

One George Street (Chinese: 乔治街一号) is a 153 m (502 ft), 23-storey class-A office building skyscraper in Raffles Place, Singapore.

The High Commissions of Canada and New Zealand currently occupy the 11th floor and the 21st floor of the office building respectively.
