= Canada–Singapore relations =

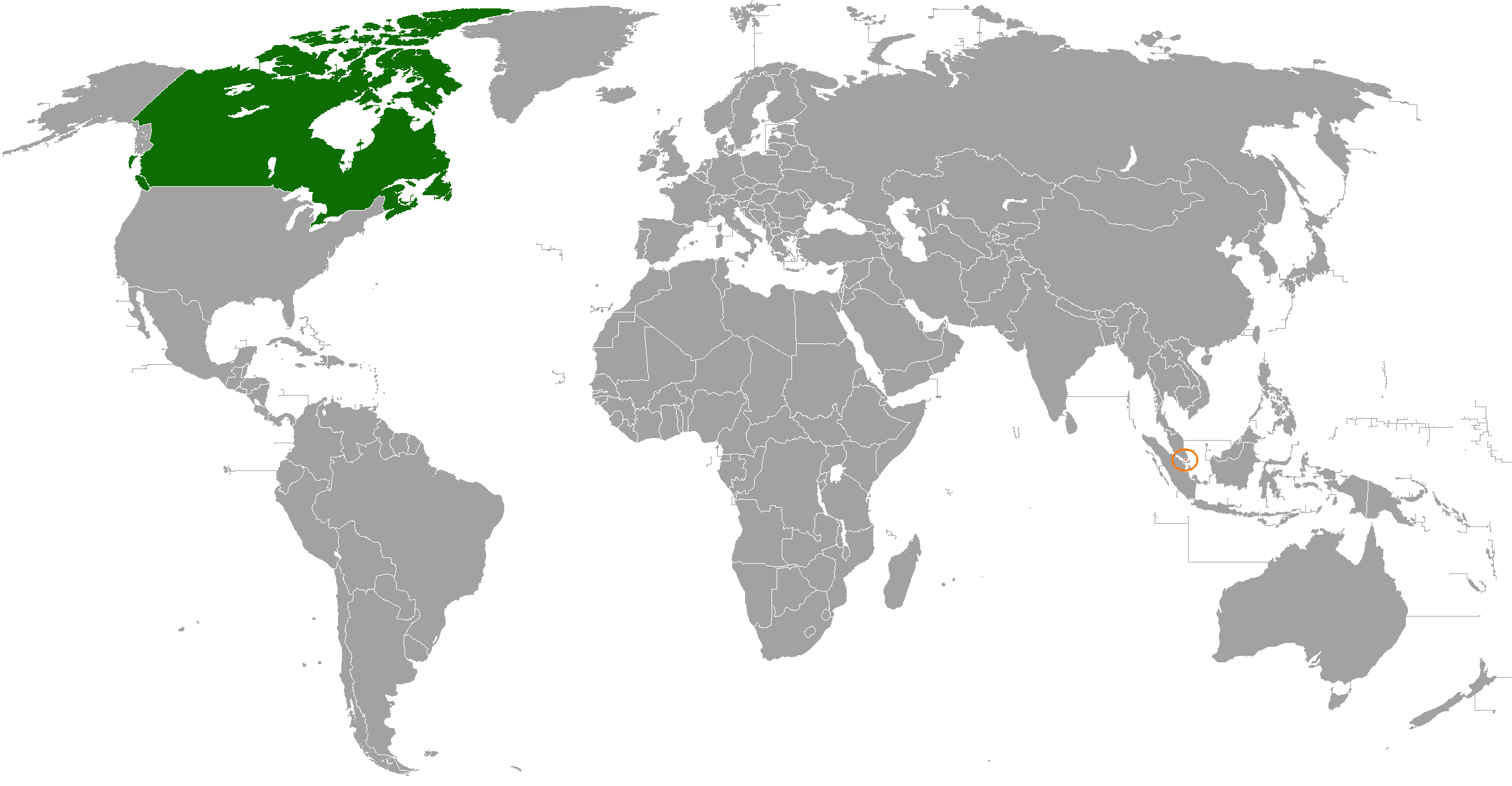

- Canada: Singapore

Canada and Singapore have maintained diplomatic relations since 1965. Both nations are members of the Asia-Pacific Economic Cooperation, Commonwealth of Nations and the United Nations.

== History ==
In 1963, Singapore obtained its independence from the United Kingdom and became an independent nation in 1965. That same year, Canada recognized and established diplomatic relations with Singapore. In 1990, the Canadian International School in Singapore was opened.

Bilateral relations between Canada and Singapore are wide-ranging, and characterized by cooperation in a variety of areas, including: trade, security and defense, education, science and technology and Arctic related issues. In July 1990, Canadian Prime Minister, Brian Mulroney, traveled to Singapore to attend the 2nd APEC Summit. In 1997, Singaporean Prime Minister, Goh Chok Tong, traveled to Canada to attend the 9th APEC Summit in Vancouver. In November 2009, Canadian Prime Minister, Stephen Harper, traveled to Singapore to attend the 21st APEC Summit.

In 2015, both nations celebrated 50 years of diplomatic relations. In November 2018, Canadian Prime Minister, Justin Trudeau, paid a visit to Singapore to attend the 33rd Association of Southeast Asian Nations (ASEAN) Summit.

== High-level visits ==
High-level visits from Canada to Singapore

- Prime Minister Brian Mulroney (1990)
- Prime Minister Stephen Harper (2009)
- Governor General David Johnston (2015)
- Foreign Minister Stéphane Dion (2016)
- Minister of National Defense Harjit Sajjan (2016, 2017, 2018, 2019)
- Minister of International Trade François-Philippe Champagne (2017, 2018)
- Foreign Minister Chrystia Freeland (2018)
- Minister of International Trade Jim Carr (2018)
- Prime Minister Justin Trudeau (2018, 2023)
- Prime Minister Mark Carney (2025)

High-level visits from Singapore to Canada

- Prime Minister Goh Chok Tong (1997)

== Bilateral agreements ==
Both nations have signed a few agreements such as an Agreement on the Avoidance of Double Taxation and the Prevention of Fiscal Evasion with respect to Taxes on Income (1976) and an Agreement on Cooperation in Information and Computer Technology, which focuses on improving broadband connectivity and linkages (1998).

== Trade ==
In 2018, two-way trade between both nations totaled US$2.53 billion. Canada's main exports to Singapore include: mechanical machinery; electrical machinery and equipment; and scientific and precision instruments. Singapore's main exports to Canada include: electrical machinery and equipment; scientific and precision instruments; and mechanical machinery. In 2018, Singapore was Canada's largest destination in Southeast Asia for Canadian direct investment abroad, and Canada's largest source of foreign direct investment from Southeast Asia.

== Diplomatic missions ==
- Canada has a high commission in Singapore.
- Singapore is accredited to Canada from a non-resident high commissioner based in Singapore and maintains honorary consulates-general in Toronto and Vancouver.
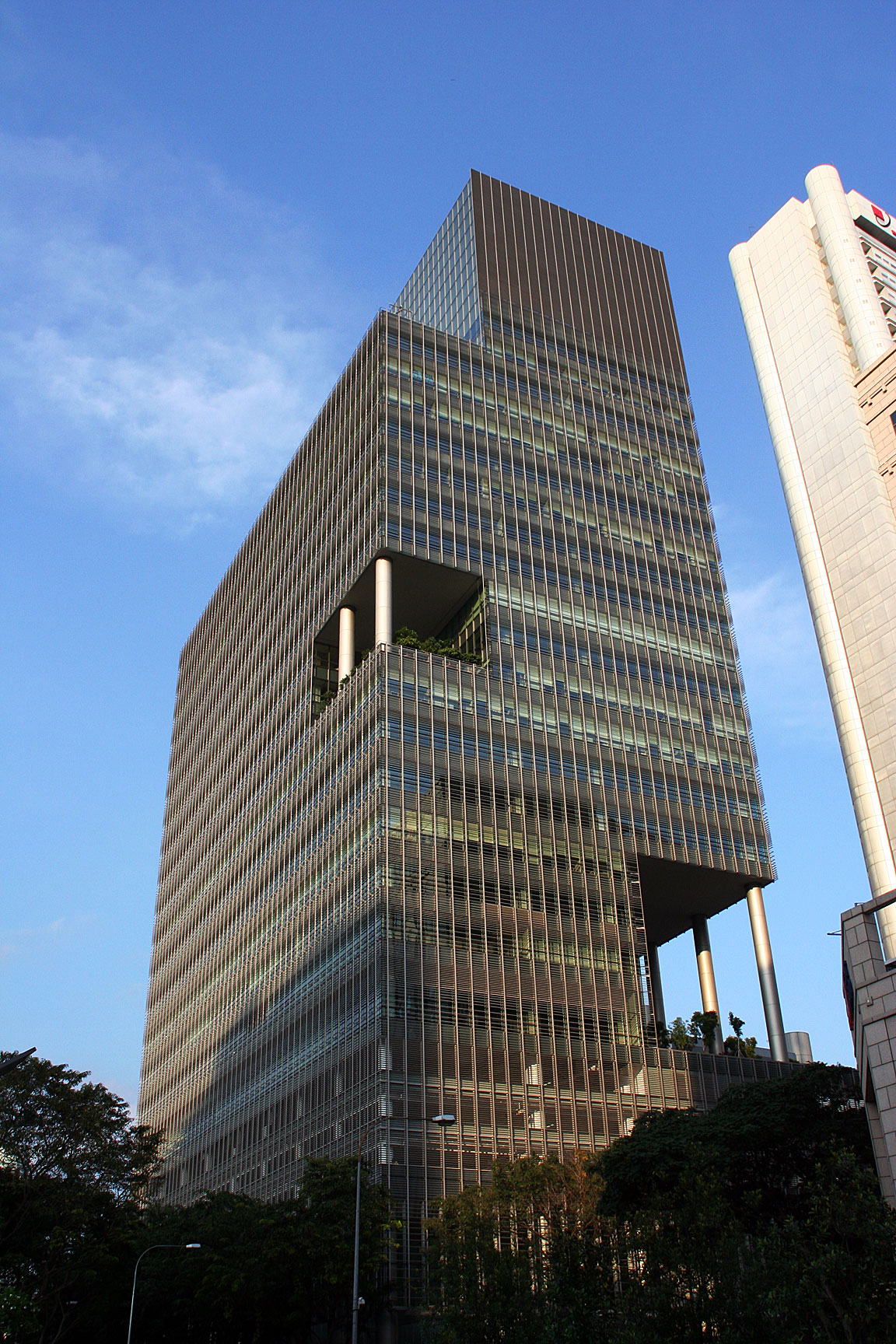
Building hosting the Canadian High Commission in Singapore

== See also ==
- Singaporean Canadians
- Foreign relations of Canada
- Foreign relations of Singapore
