= List of diplomatic missions of Singapore =

This is a list of diplomatic missions of Singapore. Singapore opened its first diplomatic missions in Jakarta, Kuala Lumpur, and New York City in the first few months after gaining independence in 1965. The country currently maintains 50 representative offices in 33 countries and territories.

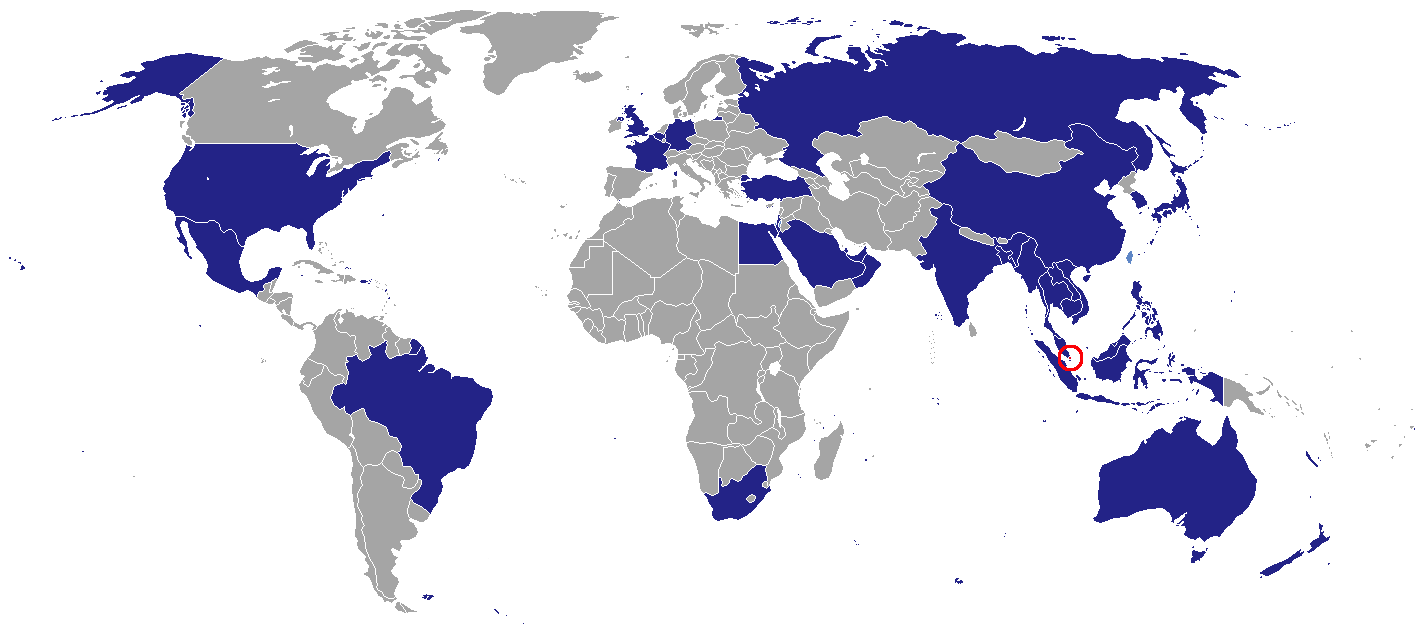
Singaporean diplomatic missions

== Current missions ==
=== Africa ===
| Host country | Host city | Mission | Current Head of Mission | Concurrent Accreditation |
|---|---|---|---|---|
| Egypt | Cairo | Embassy | Dominic Goh (Ambassador) | Algeria; Ethiopia; Morocco; Jordan; Lebanon; Libya; Syria |
| South Africa | Pretoria | High Commission | Zainal Arif Mantaha (High Commissioner) | Botswana; Eswatini; Lesotho; Namibia; Zimbabwe |

=== Americas ===
| Host country | Host city | Mission | Current head of mission | Concurrent accreditation |
|---|---|---|---|---|
| Brazil | Brasília | Embassy | Desmond Ng (Chargé d'Affaires) | Argentina; Chile; Colombia; Jamaica; Peru; Uruguay; Venezuela |
| Mexico | Mexico City | Embassy | Jeff Khoo (Chargé d'Affaires) | |
| United States | Washington, D.C. | Embassy | Lui Tuck Yew (Ambassador) | Belize; Canada; Costa Rica; Cuba; Dominican Republic; El Salvador; Guatemala; Honduras; Haiti; Nicaragua; Panama; Trinidad and Tobago (Note: The Embassy in Washington, D.C. oversees consular matters in Alabama, Arkansas, Delaware, Florida, Georgia, Illinois, Iowa, Kansas, Kentucky, Louisiana, Maryland, Minnesota, Mississippi, Missouri, Nebraska, North Carolina, North Dakota, Oklahoma, Puerto Rico, South Carolina, South Dakota, Tennessee, Texas, the United States Virgin Islands, Virginia, Washington, D.C., and West Virginia.) |
| United States | San Francisco | Consulate-General | Craig Lim (Consul-General) | (Note: The Consulate-General in San Francisco oversees consular matters in Alaska, American Samoa, Arizona, California, Colorado, Guam, Hawaii, Idaho, Montana, Nevada, New Mexico, the Northern Mariana Islands, Oregon, Utah, Washington, and Wyoming.) |
| United States | New York City | Consulate | Chew Ee Lin (Consul) | (Note: The Consulate in New York City oversees consular matters in Connecticut, Indiana, Maine, Massachusetts, Michigan, New Hampshire, New Jersey, New York, Ohio, Pennsylvania, Rhode Island, Vermont, and Wisconsin.) |

=== Asia ===
| Host country | Host city | Mission | Current head of mission | Concurrent accreditation |
|---|---|---|---|---|
| Bangladesh | Dhaka | High Commission | Mitchel Lee (Chargé d'Affaires a.i.) | |
| Brunei | Bandar Seri Begawan | High Commission | Laurence Bay (High Commissioner) | |
| Cambodia | Phnom Penh | Embassy | Teo Lay Cheng (Ambassador) | |
| China | Beijing | Embassy | Peter Tan Hai Chuan (Ambassador) | (Note: The Embassy in Beijing oversees consular matters in Beijing, Gansu, Hebei, Heilongjiang, Henan, Hubei, Inner Mongolia, Jilin, Liaoning, Ningxia, Qinghai, Shandong, Shanxi, Tianjin, Tibet, and Xinjiang.) |
| China | Chengdu | Consulate-General | Joel Tan (Consul-General) | (Note: The Consulate-General in Chengdu oversees consular matters in Chongqing, Shaanxi, and Sichuan.) |
| China | Guangzhou | Consulate-General | Loh Tuck Keat (Consul-General) | (Note: The Consulate-General in Guangzhou oversees consular matters in Guangdong, Guangxi, Guizhou, Hainan, Hunan, and Yunnan.) |
| China | Hong Kong | Consulate-General | Ong Siew Gay (Consul-General) | (Note: The Consulate-General in Hong Kong oversees consular matters in Hong Kong and Macao.) |
| China | Shanghai | Consulate-General | Chua Teng Hoe (Consul-General) | (Note: The Consulate-General in Shanghai oversees consular matters in Anhui, Jiangsu, Shanghai, and Zhejiang.) |
| China | Xiamen | Consulate-General | Ch’ng Tze Chia (Consul-General) | (Note: The Consulate-General in Xiamen oversees consular matters in Fujian and Jiangxi.) |
| India | New Delhi | High Commission | Simon Wong (High Commissioner) | Bhutan; Nepal; Sri Lanka (Note: The High Commission in New Delhi oversees consular matters in Arunachal Pradesh, Assam, Bihar, Chandigarh, Haryana, Himachal Pradesh, Jammu and Kashmir, Jharkhand, Ladakh, Manipur, Meghalaya, Mizoram, Nagaland, New Delhi, Punjab, Rajasthan, Sikkim, Tripura, Uttaranchal, Uttar Pradesh, and West Bengal.) |
| India | Chennai | Consulate-General | Edgar Pang (Consul-General) | (Note: The Consulate-General in Chennai oversees consular matters in Andhra Pradesh, Karnataka, Kerala, Puducherry, Tamil Nadu, and Telangana.) |
| India | Mumbai | Consulate-General | Cheong Ming Foong (Consul-General) | (Note: The Consulate-General in Mumbai oversees consular matters in Chhattisgarh, Goa, Gujarat, Madhya Pradesh, Maharashtra, and Odisha.) |
| Indonesia | Jakarta | Embassy | Kwok Fook Seng (Ambassador) | |
| Indonesia | Batam | Consulate-General | Gavin Ang (Consul-General) | |
| Indonesia | Medan | Consulate-General | Edmund Chia Keng Wei (Consul-General) | |
| Israel | Tel Aviv | Embassy | Ian Mak Jung-I (Ambassador) | |
| Japan | Tokyo | Embassy | Ong Eng Chuan (Ambassador) | |
| Laos | Vientiane | Embassy | Sudesh Maniar (Ambassador) | |
| Malaysia | Kuala Lumpur | High Commission | Vanu Gopala Menon (High Commissioner) | |
| Malaysia | Johor Bahru | Consulate-General | Ng Kuan Khai (Consul-General) | |
| Myanmar | Yangon | Embassy | Vanessa Chan (Ambassador) | |
| Oman | Muscat | Embassy | Syed Noureddin Bin Syed Hassim (Chargé d'Affaires a.i.) | |
| Palestine | Ramallah | Representative Office | Shireen Shelleh (Honorary Director) | |
| Philippines | Manila | Embassy | Constance See (Ambassador) | |
| Qatar | Doha | Embassy | Pong Kok Tian (Ambassador) | Iraq |
| Saudi Arabia | Riyadh | Embassy | Sadasivan Premjith (Ambassador) | Bahrain; Pakistan |
| Saudi Arabia | Jeddah | Consulate-General | Chandra Kumar (Consul-General) | |
| South Korea | Seoul | Embassy | Eric Teo (Ambassador) | Mongolia |
| Taiwan | Taipei | Trade Office | Yip Wei Kiat (Trade Representative) | |
| Thailand | Bangkok | Embassy | Catherine Wong (Ambassador) | |
| Timor-Leste | Dili | Embassy | William Chik (Chargé d'Affaires a.i.) | |
| Turkey | Ankara | Embassy | Kok Li Peng (Ambassador) | |
| United Arab Emirates | Abu Dhabi | Embassy | Kamal R Vaswani (Ambassador) | Kuwait |
| United Arab Emirates | Dubai | Consulate-General | Syed Muhammad Raziff Aljunied (Consul-General) | |
| Vietnam | Hanoi | Embassy | Rajpal Singh (Ambassador) | |
| Vietnam | Ho Chi Minh City | Consulate-General | Roy Kho (Consul-General) | |

=== Europe ===
| Host country | Host city | Mission | Current head of mission | Concurrent accreditation |
|---|---|---|---|---|
| Belgium | Brussels | Embassy | Lim Hong Huai (Ambassador) | EU; Luxembourg; Netherlands; Organisation for the Prohibition of Chemical Weapons |
| France | Paris | Embassy (Note: The Deputy Chief of Mission in Paris serves concurrently as Singapore's Alternate Permanent Delegate to UNESCO.) | Umej Bhatia (Ambassador) | Italy; Portugal; Spain |
| Germany | Berlin | Embassy | Lee Chong Hock (Ambassador) | Austria; Czech Republic; Finland; Hungary; Poland; Slovenia; Sweden; Switzerland |
| Russia | Moscow | Embassy | Mark Neo (Ambassador) | Armenia; Belarus; Mongolia; Tajikistan |
| United Kingdom | London | High Commission | Ng Teck Hean (High Commissioner) | Denmark; Iceland; Ireland; Norway |

=== Oceania ===
| Host country | Host city | Mission | Current head of mission | Concurrent Accreditation |
|---|---|---|---|---|
| Australia | Canberra | High Commission | Anil Kumar Nayar (High Commissioner) | Papua New Guinea |
| New Zealand | Wellington | High Commission | Sudesh Maniar (High Commissioner) | Fiji |

=== Multinational organisations ===
| Organisation | Host city | Mission | Current permanent head of mission | Concurrent accreditation |
|---|---|---|---|---|
| Association of Southeast Asian Nations | Jakarta | Permanent Mission | Gerard Ho Wei Hong (Permanent Representative) | |
| United Nations | New York City | Permanent Mission | Burhan Gafoor (Permanent Representative) | |
| United Nations | Vienna | Permanent Mission | Jaya Ratnam (Permanent Representative) | International Atomic Energy Agency; Preparatory Commission for the Comprehensive Nuclear-Test-Ban Treaty Organization; International Narcotics Control Board etc. |
| United Nations | Geneva | Permanent Mission | Jaya Ratnam (Permanent Representative) | International Labour Organization; International Telecommunication Union; World Health Organization etc. |
| World Trade Organization | Geneva | Permanent Mission | Tan Hung Seng (Permanent Representative) | World Intellectual Property Organization |

== Gallery ==
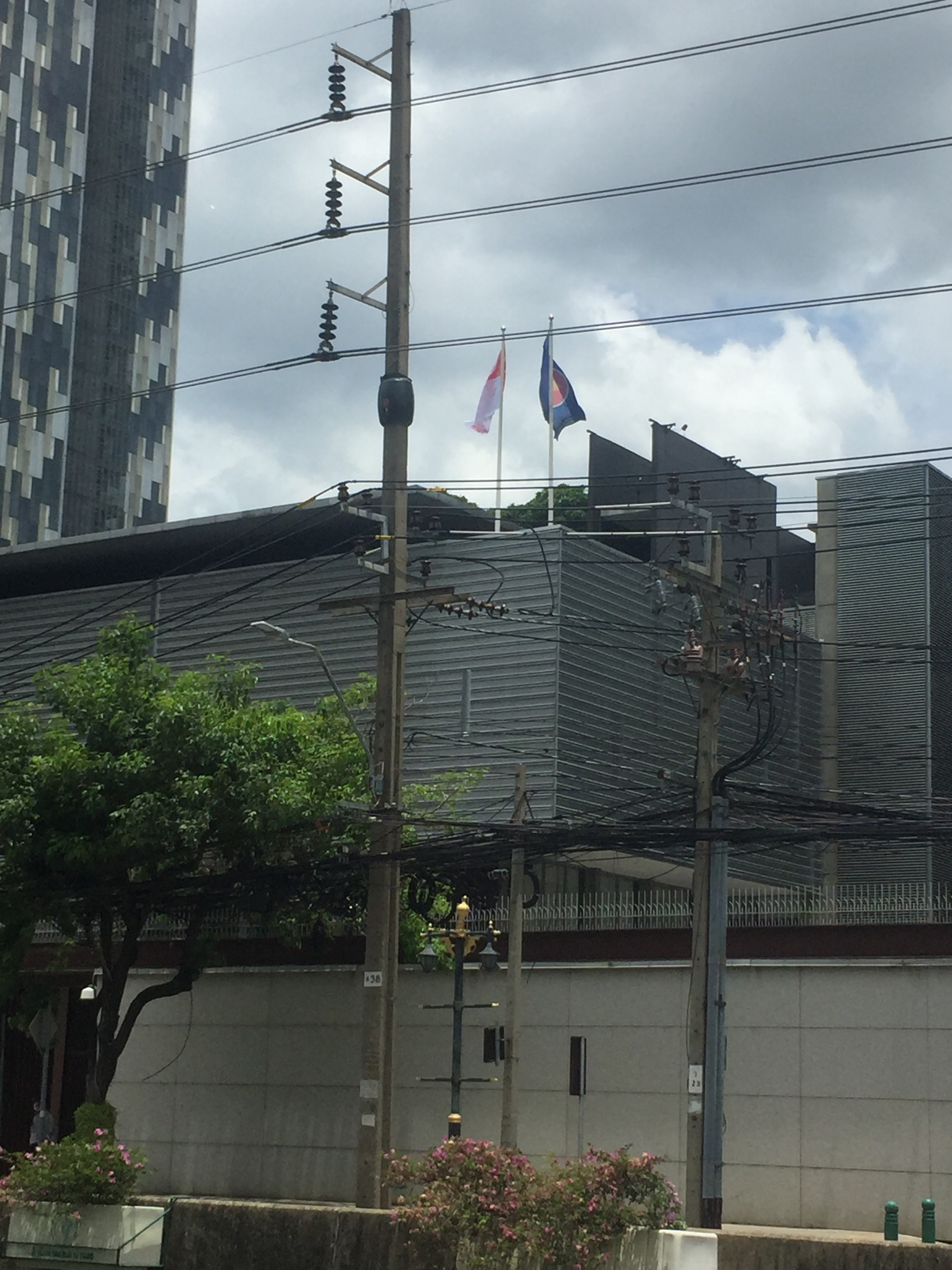
Embassy in Bangkok

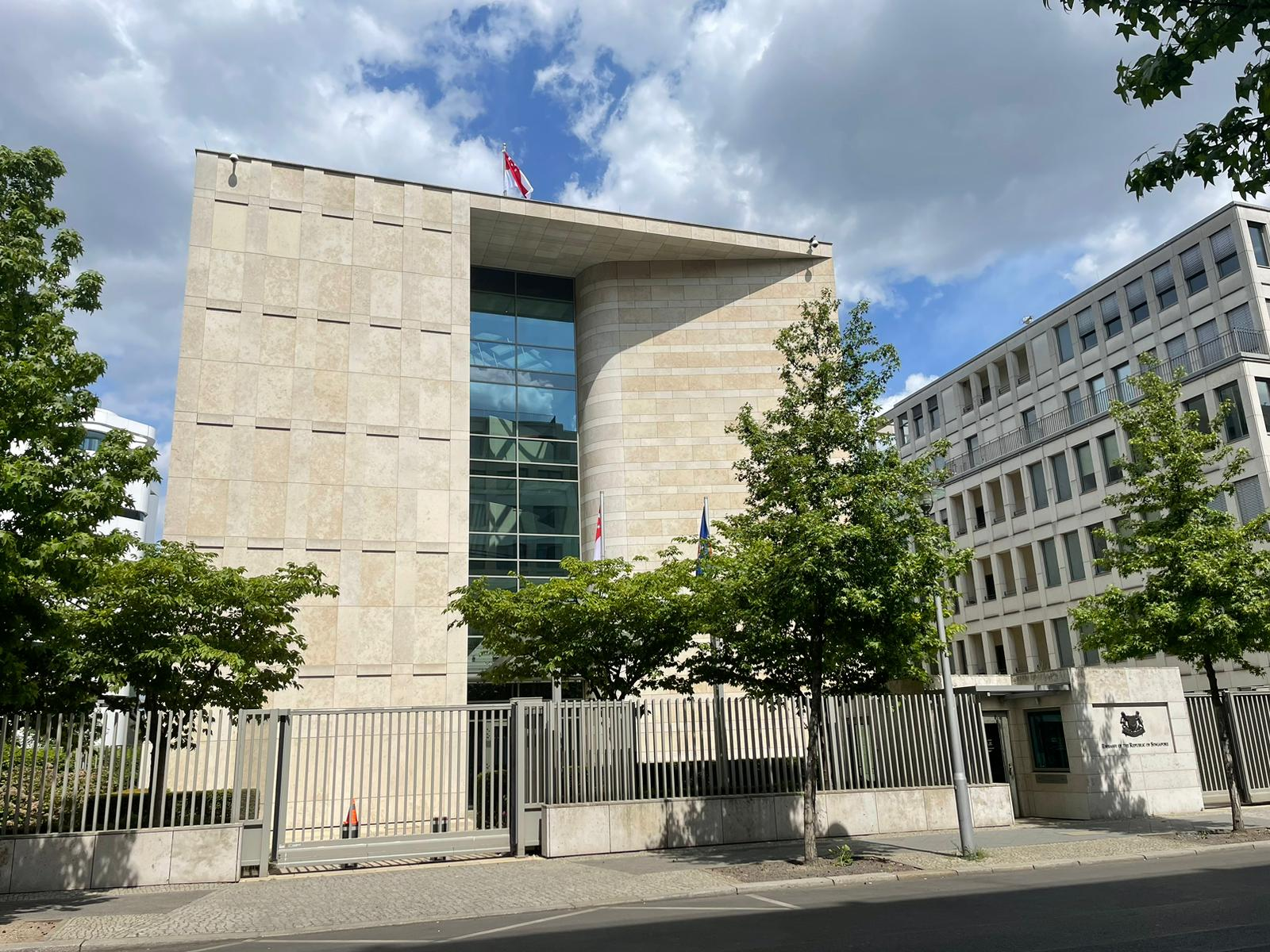
Embassy in Berlin

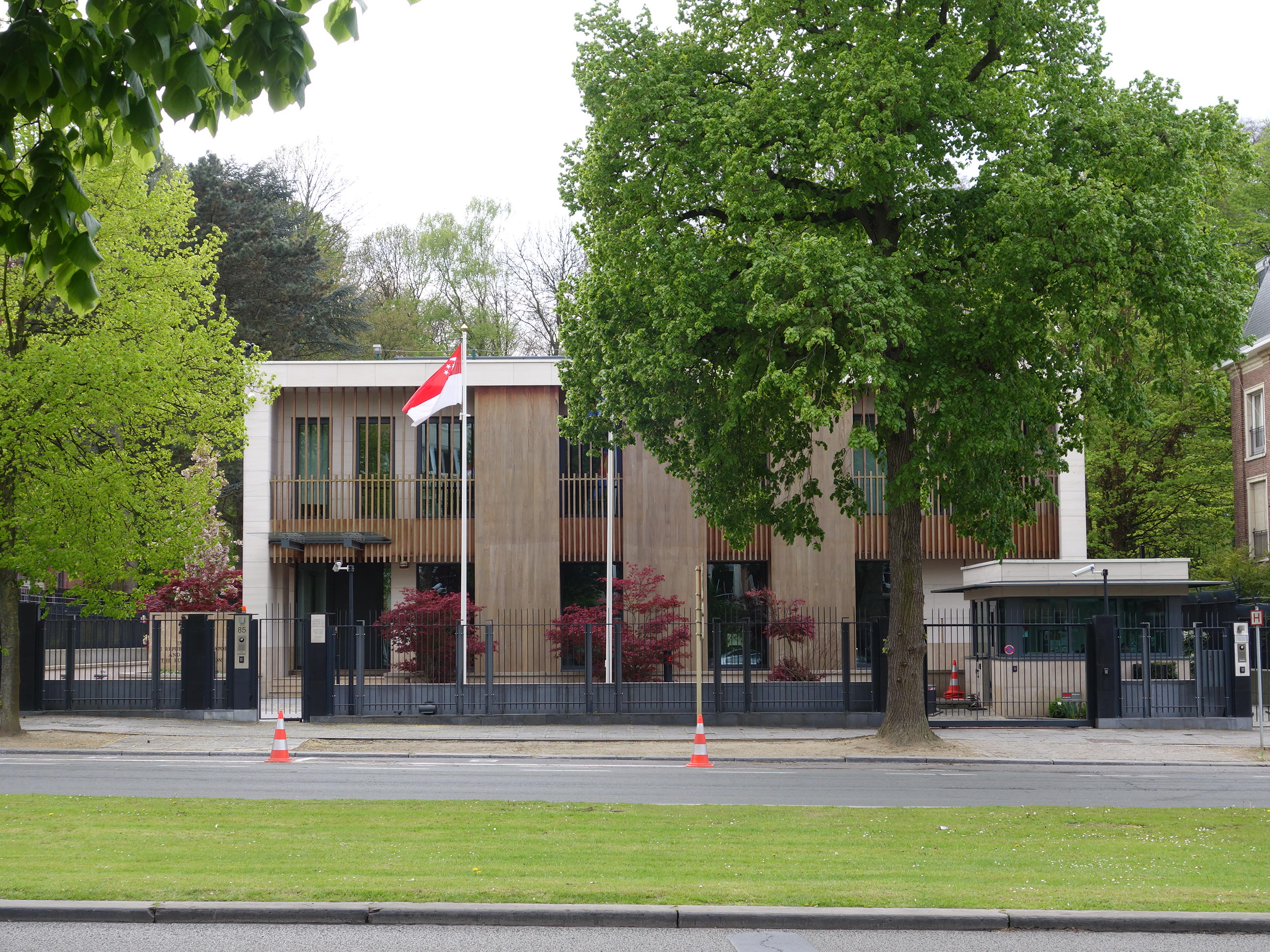
Embassy in Brussels

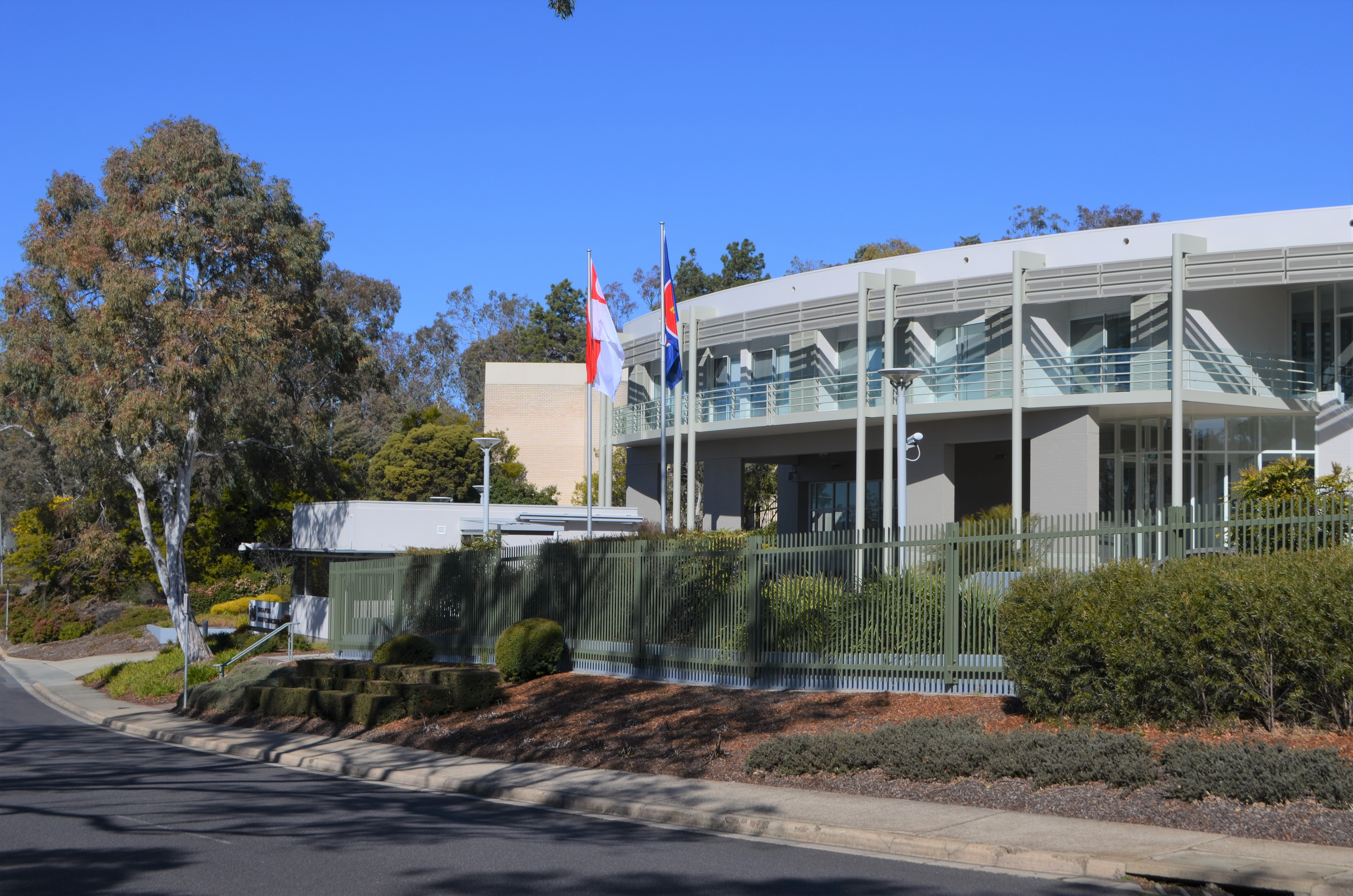
High Commission in Canberra

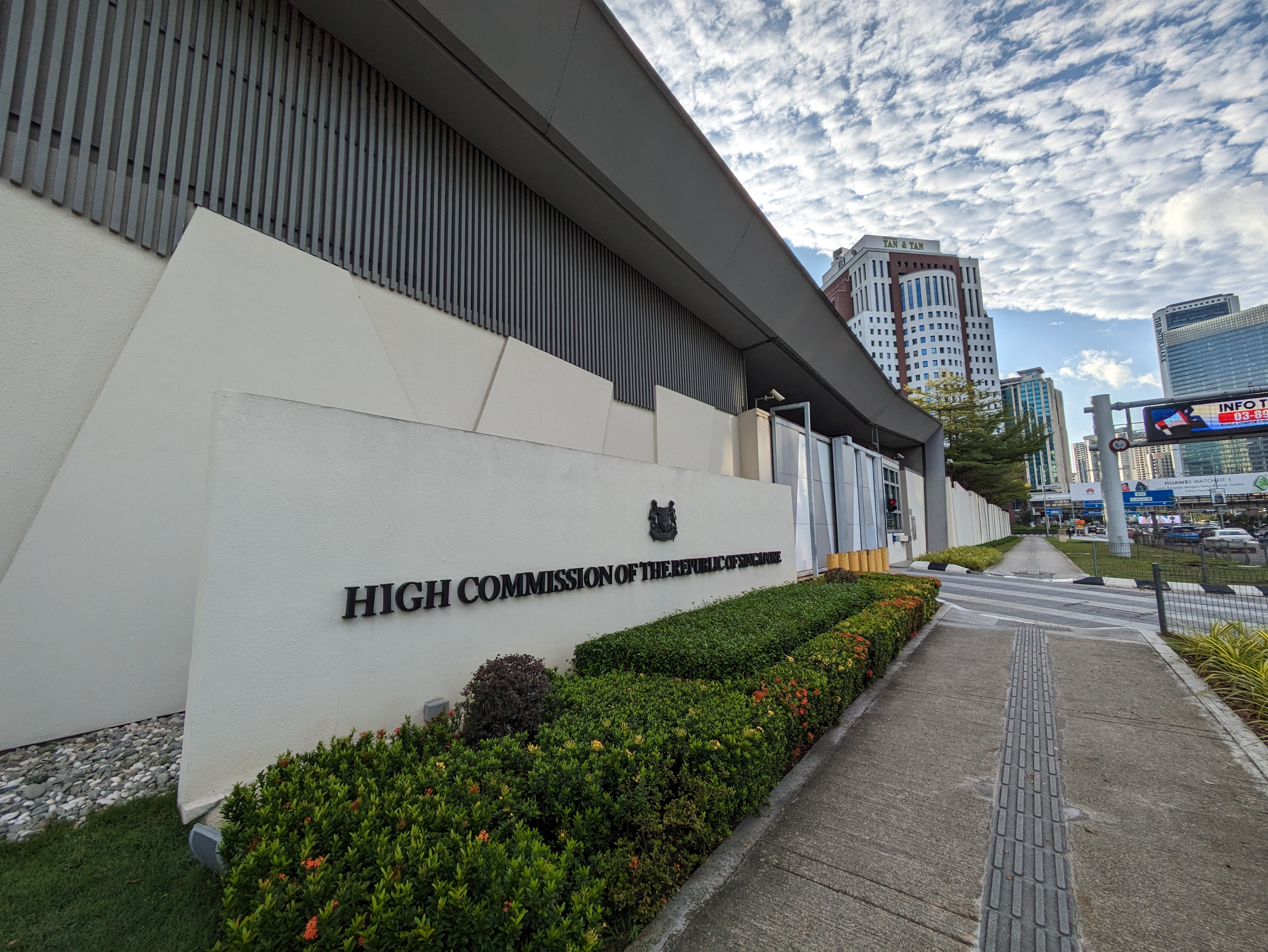
High Commission in Kuala Lumpur

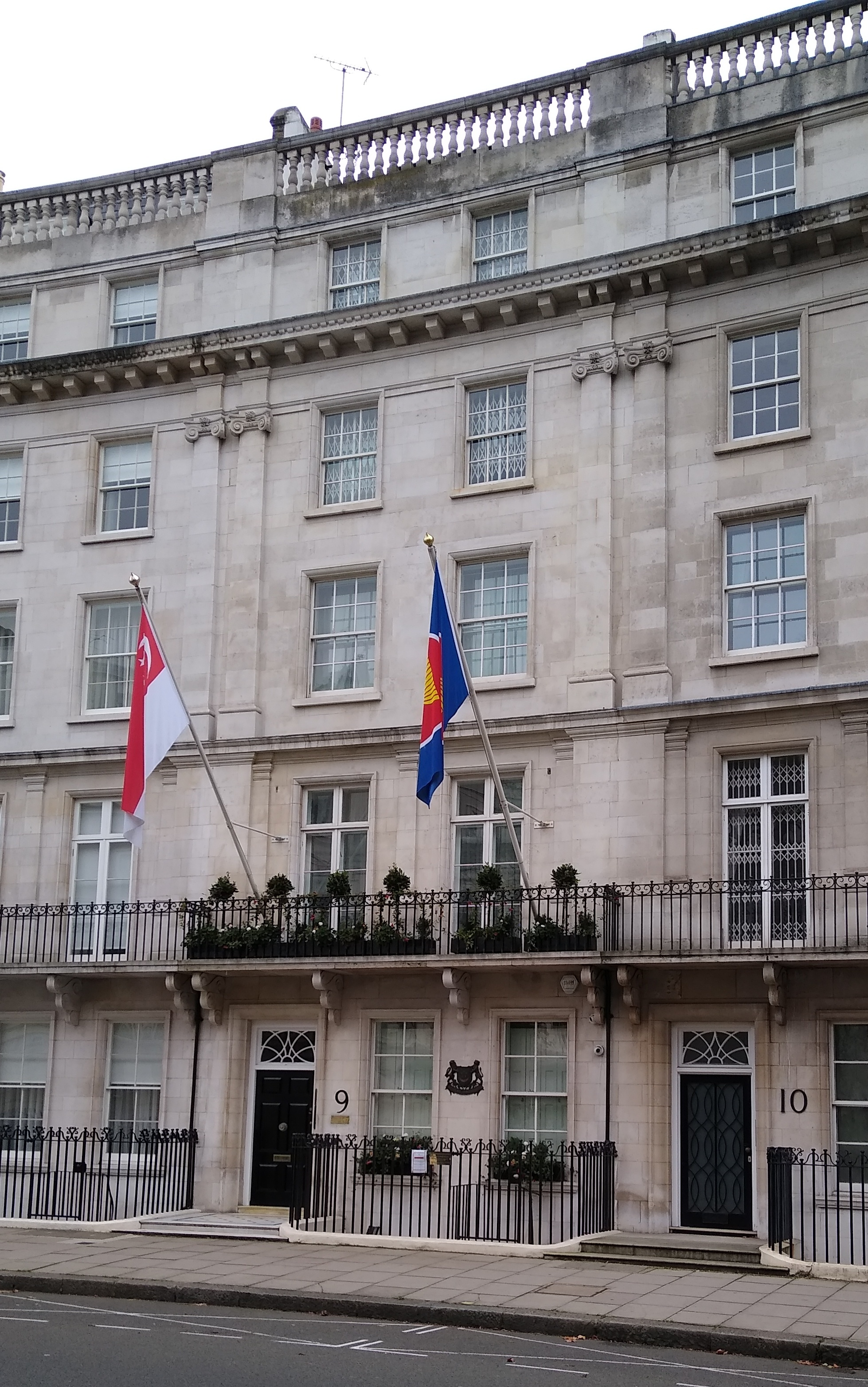
High Commission in London

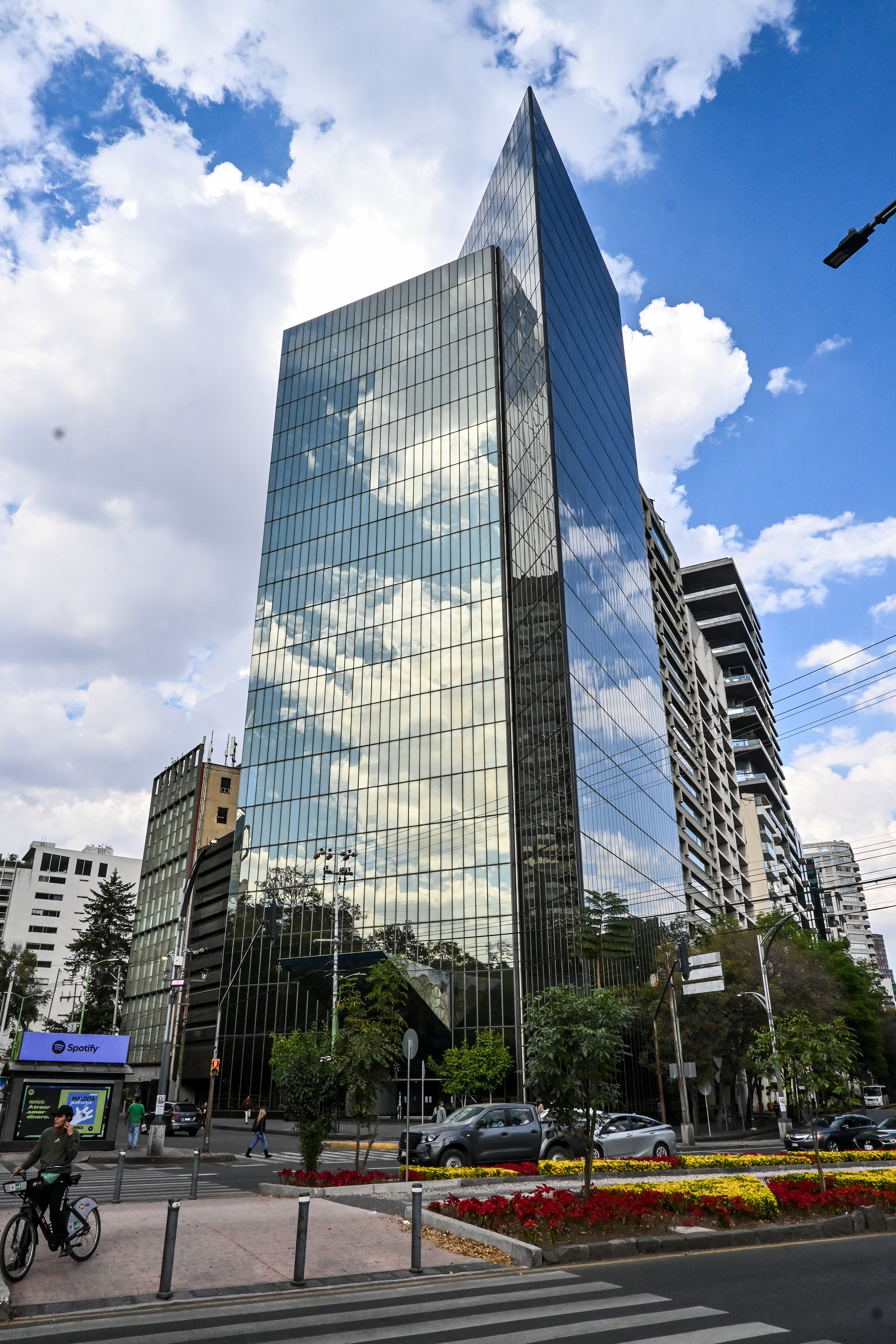
Building hosting the Embassy in Mexico City

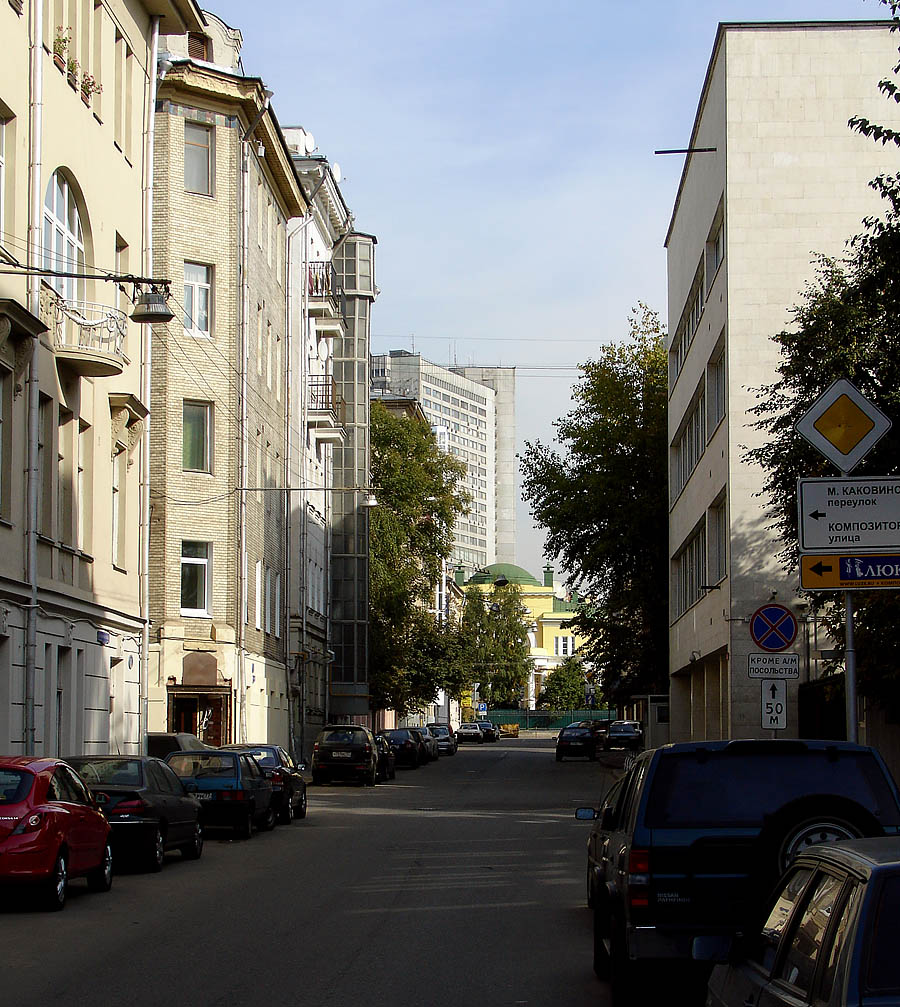
Embassy in Moscow

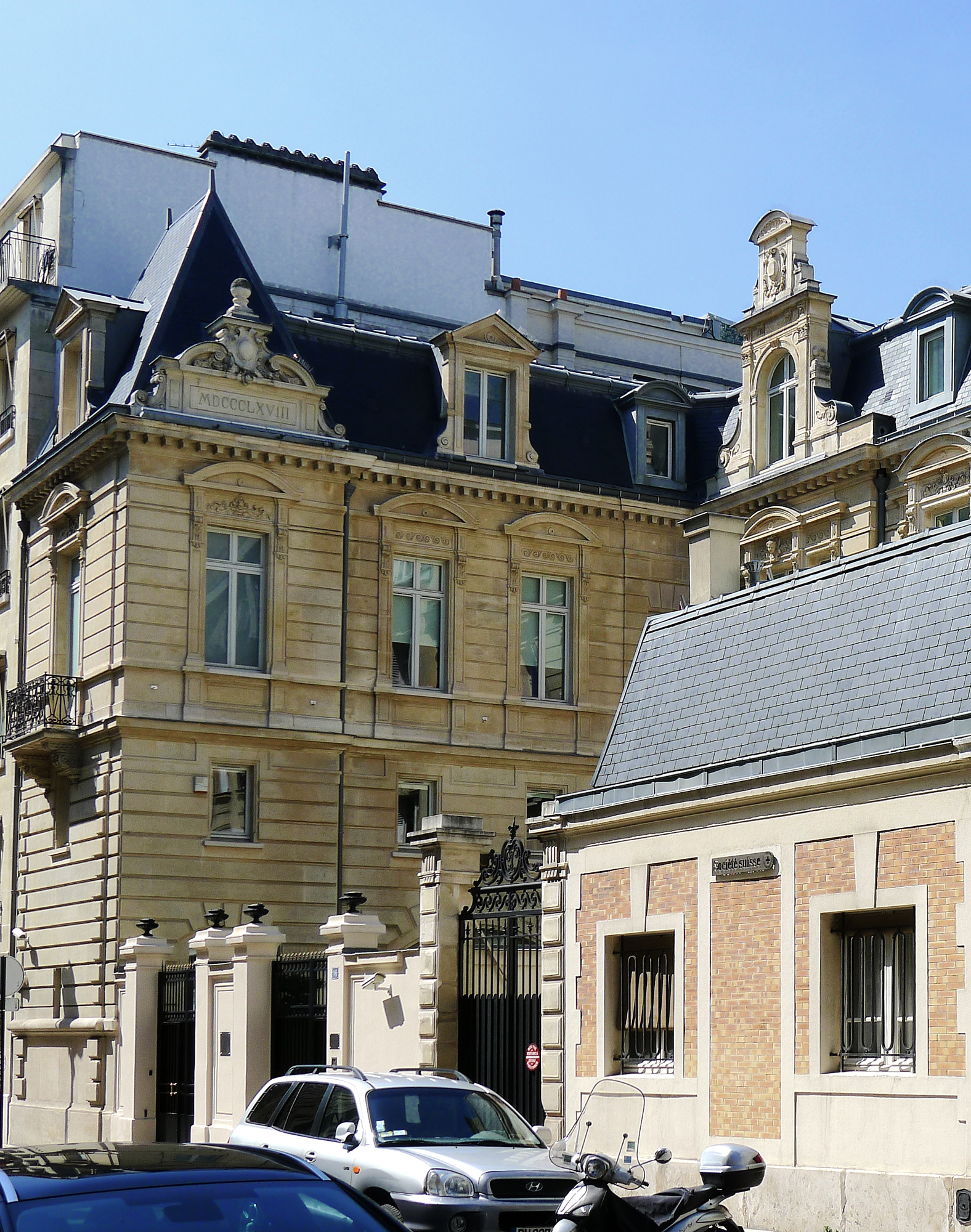
Embassy in Paris

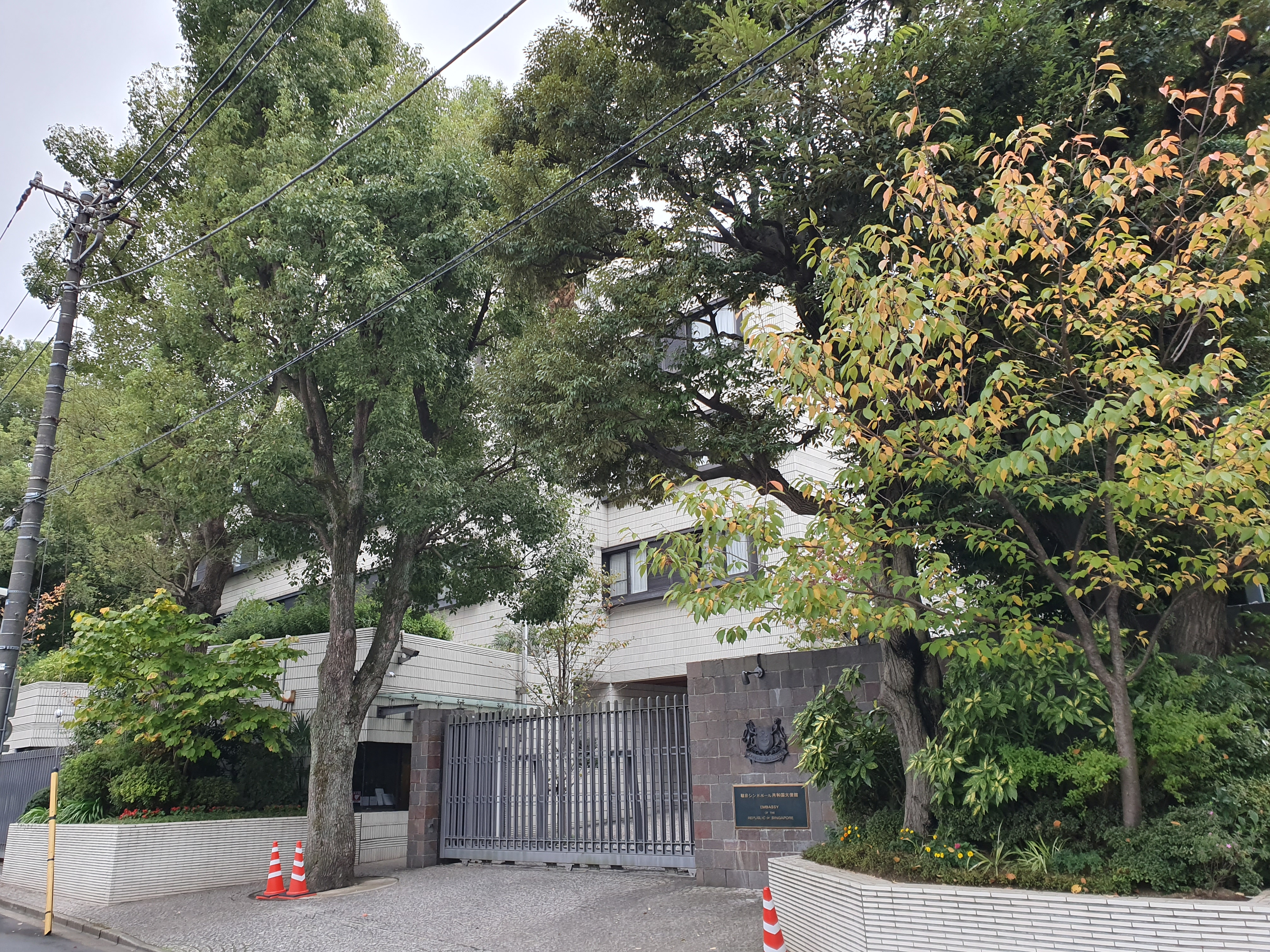
Embassy in Tokyo

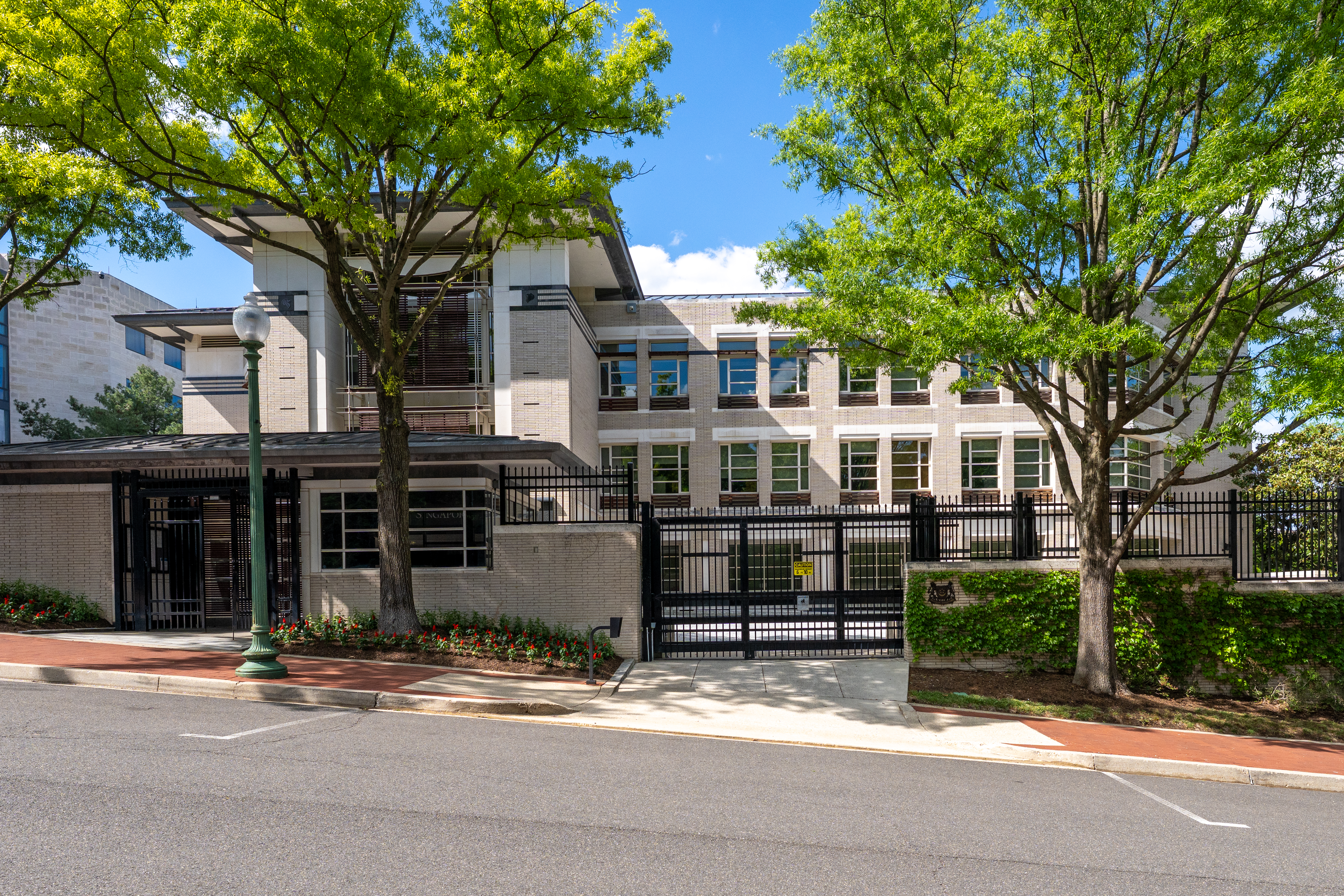
Embassy in Washington, D.C.

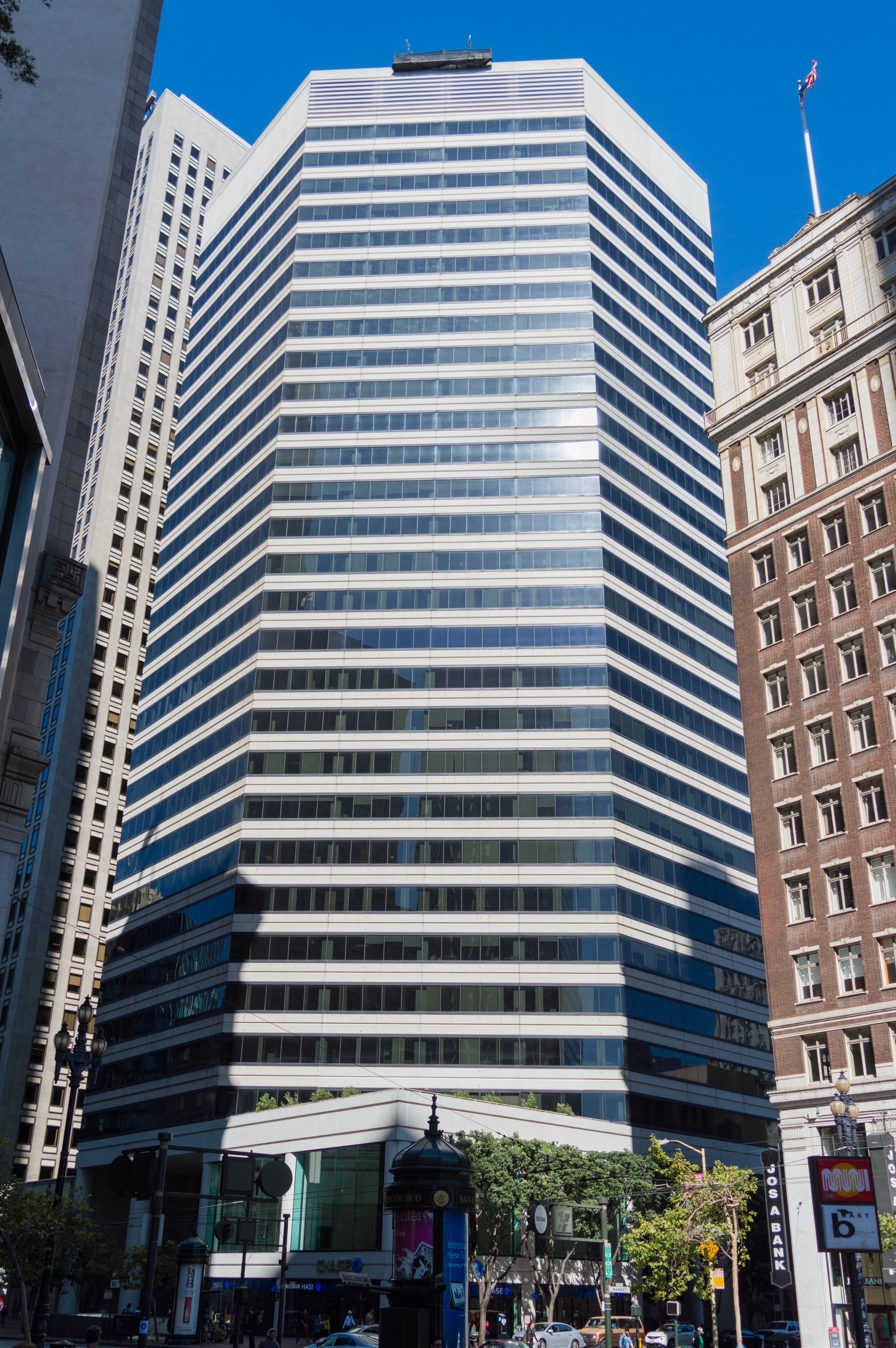
Building hosting the Consulate-General in San Francisco

== Closed missions ==
=== Asia ===
| Host country | Host city | Mission | Year closed | Ref. |
|---|---|---|---|---|
| Indonesia | Pekanbaru | Consulate | 2012 | |
| Japan | Osaka | Consulate-General | 2011 | |

== Missions to open ==
| Host country | Host city | Mission | Ref. |
|---|---|---|---|
| Ethiopia | Addis Ababa | Embassy | |
| Malaysia | Kota Kinabalu | Consulate | |
| Malaysia | Kuching | Consulate | |

== See also ==
- List of ambassadors of Singapore
- Foreign relations of Singapore
- List of diplomatic missions in Singapore
- Visa policy of Singapore
