= Grand Hyatt Singapore =

Hotel in Singapore

Coordinates: 1.30654°N 103.83302°E

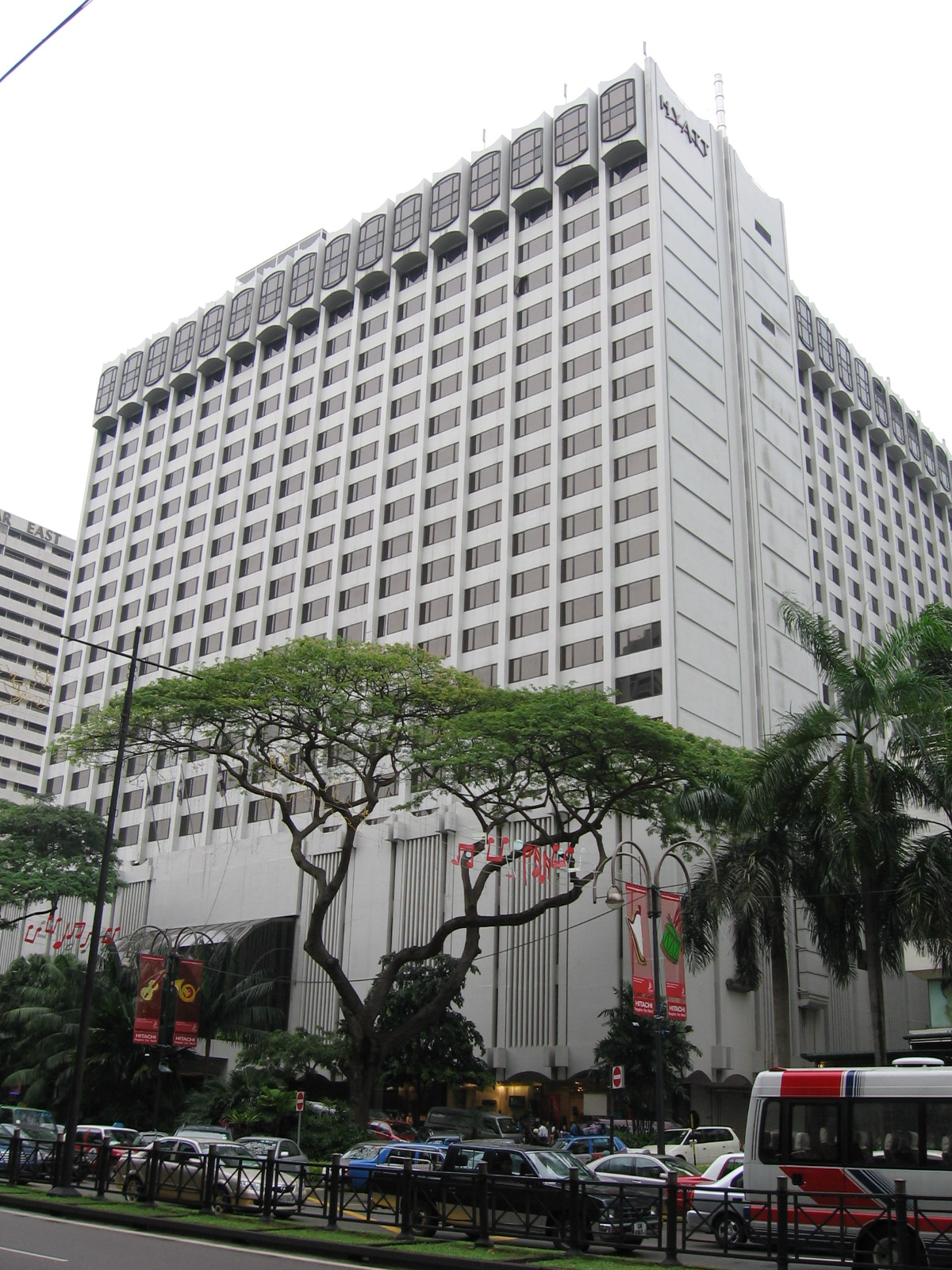
The hotel in 2005

Grand Hyatt Singapore, formerly known as Hyatt Regency Singapore and the Singapore Hyatt Hotel, is a hotel on Scotts Road in the Central Area of Singapore.

== History ==
The hotel was constructed in 1970. At the time of its completion, it was the largest hotel in Southeast Asia. 200 of the hotel's rooms, as well as the reception area, a bar and the Garden Terrace coffeehouse opened in March 1971, with the rest of the hotel being fully completed by May. The hotel was officially opened by then Minister of Social Affairs Othman Wok on 2 October, with Aw Cheng Hu, the wife of Lee Chee San, the managing director of Chung Khiaw Bank, performing the dedication ceremony. By 1979, the hotel had become the Hyatt Regency Singapore.

In January 1980, plans for a $30 million, which would increase the number of rooms by 451, were approved. The hotel's lifts were computerised in March 1983. Its rooms were refurbished in May. In December 1987, a training centre was established in the hotel in order to train staff. From 1990 to 1998, the hotel underwent major renovations, after which it became the Grand Hyatt Singapore. The hotel's lobby was remodelled in 2003.

On 27 March 2019, a kitchen fire broke out in the Mezza9 restaurant at Grand Hyatt Singapore, leading to the evacuation of about 500 guests and staff. The hotel’s sprinkler system extinguished the blaze before the arrival of firefighters, and no injuries were reported.

The hotel began renovations in October 2021. The hotel temporarily closed on 19 September 2022 due to the renovations.
