= High Commission of Canada, Singapore =

Diplomatic mission of Canada to Singapore

High Commission of Canada to Singapore
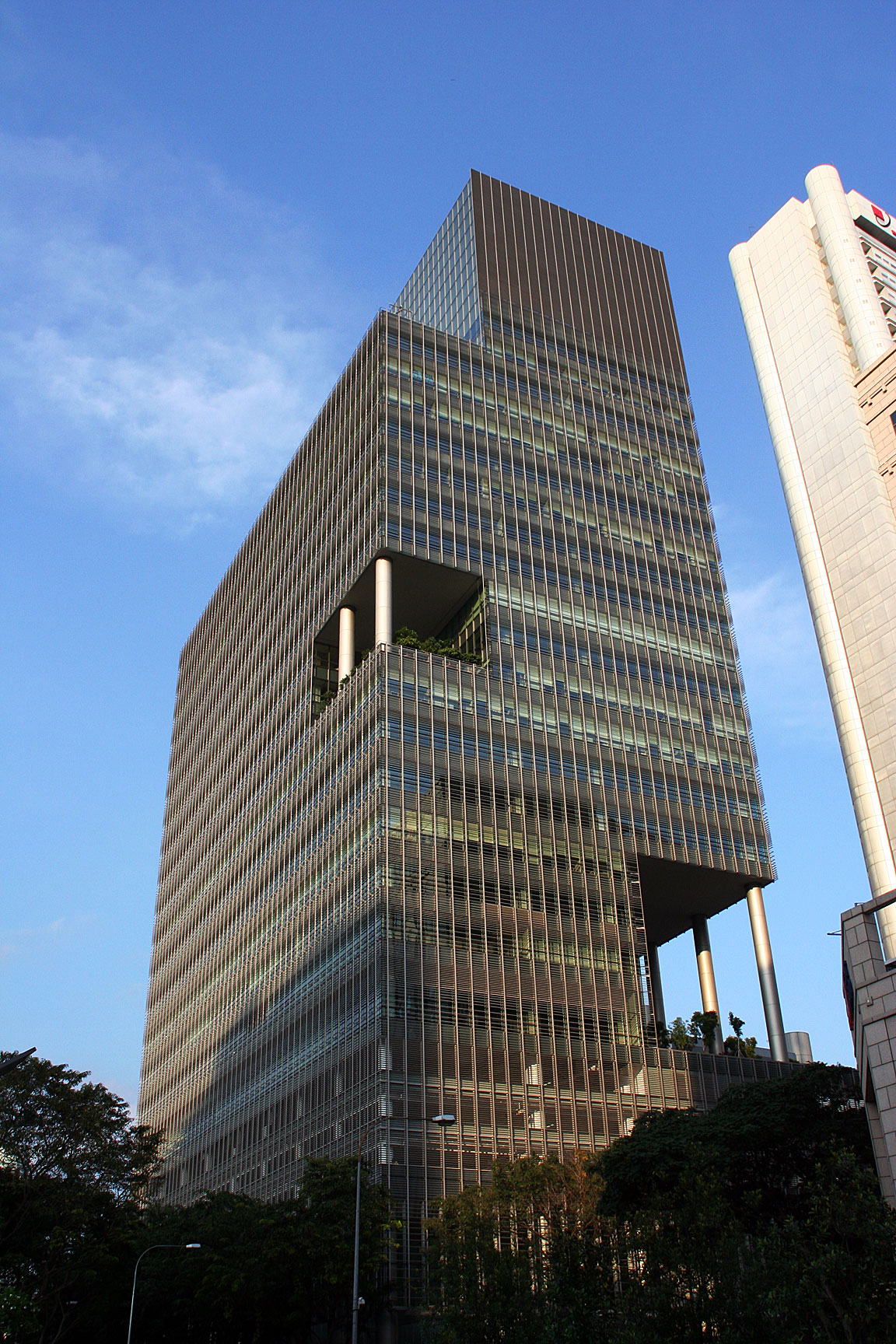
- Address: 1 George Street #11-01 Singapore 049145
- Jurisdiction: Singapore
- High Commissioner: Jean-Dominique Ieraci
- Website: Official website

The High Commission of Canada in Singapore is a diplomatic mission of Canada to Singapore. It is located at 1 George Street, Singapore. The high commission provides consular services to Canadians and visa services to foreign citizens. The high commission also covers bilateral cooperation including trade and education.

== See also ==
- Canada–Singapore relations
