= Election day =

Day when elections are held

Election day by weekday Monday Tuesday Wednesday Thursday Friday Saturday Sunday several days

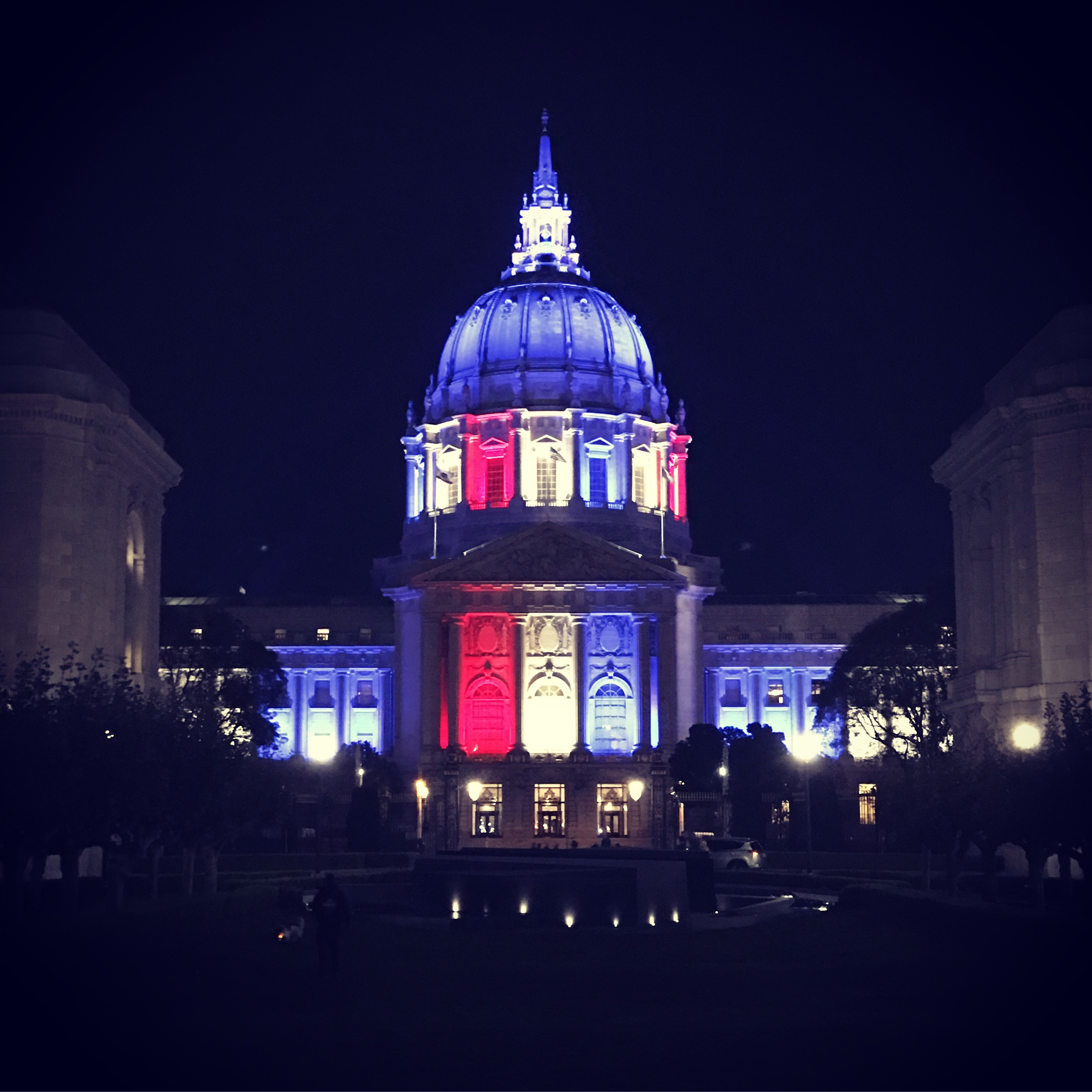
San Francisco City Hall illuminated in special LED lighting with the national colors of red, white, and blue on Election Day in the United States (Tuesday 7 November 2018) to commemorate the occasion

Election day or polling day is the day on which general elections are held. In many countries, general elections are always held on a Saturday or Sunday, to enable as many voters as possible to participate; while in other countries elections are always held on a weekday. However, some countries, or regions within a country, which hold elections on a weekday declare election day a public holiday. Countries which permit absentee ballots, early ballots or postal votes to be cast by mail before the election avoid the problem altogether by enabling voters to vote on a day that is more convenient to them.

Sundays are the most common day for elections, but this is less true in the Anglosphere; Saturdays are used in New Zealand and Australia, and weekdays for the United States, United Kingdom, and Canada. This is partially due to the influence of Protestantism, which historically set restrictions on activities other than church-going during the Sabbath (usually considered as falling on a Sunday).

An election day usually culminates in an election night when the results of the election are tallied and winners are announced.

== Election day by country/territory ==
Country/Territory	Region	Election day	political system
Albania	Europe	Sunday.	Parliamentary republic
Argentina	South America	Fourth Sunday of October immediately before the end of the current mandates.	Federal presidential republic
Austria	Europe	Sunday. Nationalrat elections may be held on another public holiday.	Semi-presidential republic
Australia	Oceania	Saturday for federal, state and most local elections. Postal and early voting permitted. Some local elections are by postal voting only.	Parliamentary monarchy
Belgium	Europe	Sunday (until 1894, Tuesday).	Parliamentary monarchy
Bolivia	South America	Sunday.	Presidential republic
Bosnia and Herzegovina	Europe	Sunday.	Parliamentary republic
Brazil	South America	First Sunday of October. Runoffs take place on the last Sunday of the same October.	Federal presidential republic
Bulgaria	Europe	Sunday.	Parliamentary republic
Canada	North America	Third Monday of October every four years, or after Parliament is dissolved by the Governor General.	Parliamentary monarchy
Chile	South America	Sunday.	Presidential republic
Colombia	South America	Sunday: the second Sunday of March for Congress, and the second Sunday of May for President and Vice President.	Presidential republic
Czech Republic	Europe	Traditionally elections are held over two days, starting on a Friday afternoon and ending the following Saturday afternoon.	Parliamentary republic
Cyprus	Europe	Saturday.	Parliamentary republic
Costa Rica	North America	Sunday: first Sunday of February for the President, Vice-President, and Legislative Assembly; second Sunday of February for municipal elections.	Presidential republic
Croatia	Europe	Sunday.	Parliamentary republic
Denmark	Europe	Elections for the Folketing usually occur on Tuesday, but this is not a statutory requirement.	Parliamentary monarchy
Ecuador	South America	Sunday.	Presidential republic
El Salvador	North America	Sunday.	Presidential republic
Estonia	Europe	Elections for the Riigikogu, which chooses both the president and prime minister, are on the first Sunday of March.	Parliamentary republic
Finland	Europe	Sunday.	Parliamentary republic
France	Europe	Sunday.	Semi-presidential republic
Germany	Europe	Sunday. Elections to the Bundestag may be held on another public holiday.	Federal parliamentary republic
Greece	Europe	Sunday.	Parliamentary republic
Hong Kong	Asia	Sunday.	
Hungary	Europe	Sunday.	Parliamentary republic
Iceland	Europe	Saturday.	Parliamentary republic
India	Asia	Elections are held over multiple days. The 2019 Indian general election, which began on a Thursday, took place over seven phases with six days between each phase. Constituencies vote only on the day of their respective phase.	Federal parliamentary republic
Indonesia	Asia	Elections are typically held on a Wednesday since 2009 for presidential elections, and since 2014 for legislative elections; both elections have been held on the same day since 2019. Election dates are determined by the General Elections Commission (Indonesian: Komisi Pemilihan Umum, KPU), but must occur "on a holiday or a day determined as a national holiday" per the Indonesian electoral law of 2017.	Presidential republic
Iran	Asia	Friday for presidential elections.	
Ireland	Europe	Typically on a Friday, but precise date set by Minister for Housing, Planning and Local Government.	Parliamentary republic
Israel	Asia	By law on the third Tuesday of Cheshvan, but normally held on a different day. Election day is a holiday in Israel, so people do not have to work.	Parliamentary republic
Italy	Europe	Municipal, provincial, and regional elections take place on a Sunday, as do elections for the Chamber of Deputies, the Senate and EU Parliament elections. Occasionally Mondays are added as voting day.	Parliamentary republic
Japan	Asia	Sunday.	Parliamentary monarchy
Latvia	Europe	Saturday.	Parliamentary republic
Lebanon	Asia	Until 2009, elections were held over several consecutive Sundays. The most recent election, the 2018 Lebanese general election, was also held on a Sunday.	Parliamentary republic
Lithuania	Europe	Elections for the Seimas are on the second Sunday of October, and for the president the last Sunday two months before the end of the current president's term.	Parliamentary republic
Luxembourg	Europe	Sunday.	Parliamentary monarchy
Macau	Asia	Sunday.	
Macedonia	Europe	Sunday, but the 2020 North Macedonian parliamentary election departed from this standard. It was held over three weekdays after being postponed due to the COVID-19 pandemic.	Parliamentary republic
Malta	Europe	Saturday.	Parliamentary republic
Malaysia	Asia	Saturday	Parliamentary monarchy
Mexico	North America	First Sunday of July until 2018. From 2021, the first Sunday of June.	Federal presidential republic
Montenegro	Europe	Sunday for Parliamentary elections.	Parliamentary republic
Netherlands	Europe	Typically on a Wednesday. For elections to the European Parliament, Thursday.	Parliamentary monarchy
New Zealand	Oceania	Saturday.	Parliamentary monarchy
Nicaragua	North America	Sunday.	Presidential republic
Norway	Europe	Monday in early September. Exact date set by the King of Norway.	Parliamentary monarchy
Panama	North America	Sunday.	Presidential republic
Paraguay	South America	Sunday.	Presidential republic
Peru	South America	Sunday.	Presidential republic
Philippines	Asia	Second Monday in May.	Presidential republic
Poland	Europe	Sunday.	Semi-presidential republic
Portugal	Europe	Sunday.	Parliamentary republic
Puerto Rico	North America	Day after the first Monday in November.	
Romania	Europe	Sunday.	Parliamentary republic
Russia	Europe	Sunday.	Presidential republic
Serbia	Europe	Sunday.	Semi-presidential republic
Singapore	Asia	Saturday, in most of all elections except on three elections (2015 Parliamentary, 2020 Parliamentary, and 2023 Presidential), which fell on a Friday instead. By law, polling day is a public holiday, except in by-elections.	Parliamentary republic
Slovakia	Europe	Saturday.	Parliamentary republic
Slovenia	Europe	Sunday.	Parliamentary republic
South Korea	Asia	Usually Wednesday (although the most recent election in 2025 was held on a Tuesday). Election day is a national holiday.	Presidential republic
Spain	Europe	There is no fixed election day for general elections, although since 1986 every general election has been held on Sunday. (Note: 22 June 1986, 29 October 1989, 6 June 1993, 3 March 1996, 12 March 2000, 14 March 2004, 9 March 2008, 20 November 2011, 20 December 2015, 26 June 2016.) Municipal and provincial elections take place on the fourth Sunday of May.	Parliamentary monarchy
Sweden	Europe	Second Sunday of September.	Parliamentary monarchy
Switzerland	Europe	Saturday and Sunday.	Federal parliamentary republic
Taiwan	Asia	Saturday.	Semi-presidential republic
Thailand	Asia	Sunday.	Parliamentary monarchy
Turkey	Europe	Sunday.	Presidential republic
Ukraine	Europe	Sunday.	Semi-presidential republic
United Kingdom	Europe	Thursday. See also: Election Day (United Kingdom)	Parliamentary monarchy
United States	North America	All federal elections take place the Tuesday after the first Monday in November. See also: Election Day (United States)	Federal presidential republic
Uruguay	South America	Sunday.	Presidential republic
Venezuela	South America	Sunday.	Presidential republic
Vietnam	Asia	Sunday.	

== Other bodies ==
Elections to the European Parliament take place over a period of four days (i.e., Thursday through to Sunday), according to the election days of the EU members states (as listed above). There are some exceptions; as Wednesday was not covered by the available dates, the Netherlands holds elections on Thursday, while Denmark holds elections on Sunday. Countries that hold the ballot before Sunday are not permitted to announce results until all other countries have finished voting.

== See also ==
- Early voting
- Election silence
