= Vellama d/o Marie Muthu v. Attorney-General =

2013 Singaporean court case

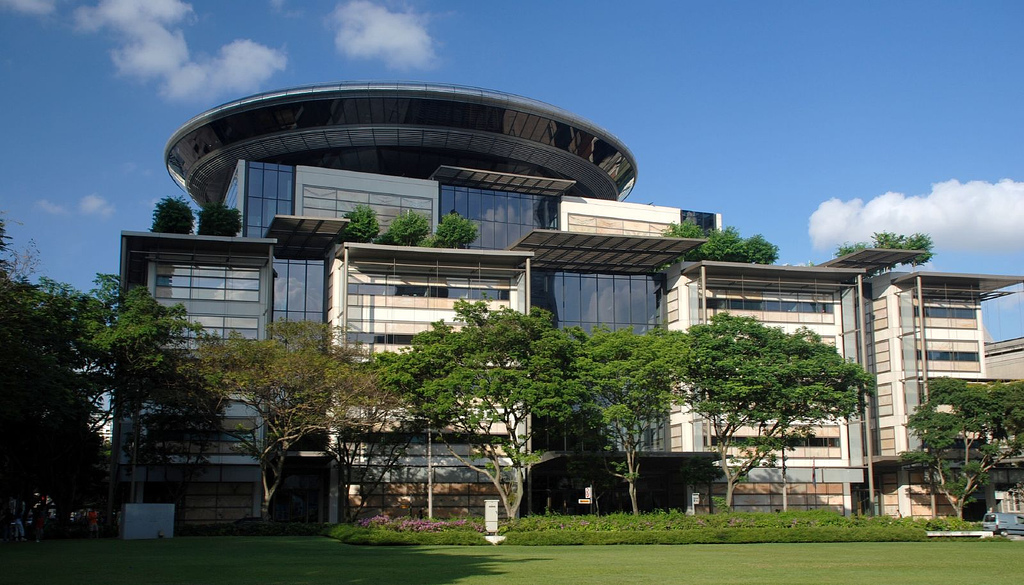
- The Supreme Court Building, photographed on 10 February 2007
- Court: Court of Appeal of Singapore
- Full case name: Vellama d/o Marie Muthu v. Attorney-General
- Decided: 5 July 2013
- Citations: [2013] SGCA 39, [2013] 4 S.L.R. 1

Case history
- Appealed from: Vellama d/o Marie Muthu v. Attorney-General [2012] SGHC 155, [2012] 4 S.L.R. 698, High Court (Singapore)
- Related actions: Vellama d/o Marie Muthu v. Attorney-General [2012] SGHC 74, [2012] 2 S.L.R. 1033, H.C. (Singapore) (leave); Vellama d/o Marie Muthu v. Attorney-General [2012] SGHC 221, [2013] 1 S.L.R. 797, H.C. (Singapore) (costs); Attorney-General v. Vellama d/o Marie Muthu [2012] SGCA 64, [2013] 1 S.L.R. 439, Court of Appeal (Singapore) (costs for AG's withdrawal of appeal)

Court membership
- Judges sitting: Chao Hick Tin, Andrew Phang and V. K. Rajah JJ.A.

Case opinions
- Article 49(1) of the Constitution provides that the Prime Minister does not have unfettered discretion in deciding whether to call a by-election in event of a casual vacancy in a Single Member Constituency; he must do so with "all convenient speed".
- Decision by: Chao Hick Tin J.A.

Vellama d/o Marie Muthu v. Attorney-General was a 2013 decision of the Court of Appeal of Singapore which held that Article 49(1) of the Constitution requires the Prime Minister to call a by-election when a casual vacancy arises in a Single Member Constituency ("SMC"), though the election need only be called within a reasonable time.

The holding was an obiter dictum, that is, not required for the decision in the case and therefore not a binding precedent, though it may be persuasive in future cases. This was because the Court dismissed the appeal on the ground that the appellant, Madam Vellama, lacked standing. She had originally applied for judicial review in 2012 to ask the High Court to order the Prime Minister to call a by-election in Hougang Single Member Constituency following the expulsion of her Member of Parliament (MP) by his political party, the Workers' Party of Singapore. However, by the time the matter came on appeal, the 2012 by-election had been called and held. Therefore, she was arguably no longer directly affected by the lack of an MP in her constituency. Her only remaining interest was in having the Prime Minister correctly interpret Article 49(1) of the Constitution. This was a public right that she shared equally with all other citizens. Since she was unable to prove "special damage" – she was neither affected to a greater extent nor in a different manner from other citizens – she did not have standing to proceed with the appeal.

Although the Court of Appeal rejected Vellama's appeal on the preliminary ground of a lack of standing, it went on to consider the substantive issues raised. Disagreeing with the High Court's judgment, the Court of Appeal interpreted Article 49(1) of the Constitution as providing that the Prime Minister does not have unfettered discretion in deciding whether or not to call a by-election when a casual vacancy in an SMC arises. Noting the absence in Article 49(1) of a specific time frame within which a parliamentary vacancy must be filled, the Court held that the Prime Minister must do so with "all convenient speed" in line with the common law concept of reasonable time. However, given the polycentric nature of the decision, the Court felt it was undesirable to lay down specific considerations or factors which would determine whether the Prime Minister had or had not called a by-election in reasonable time.

== Facts ==
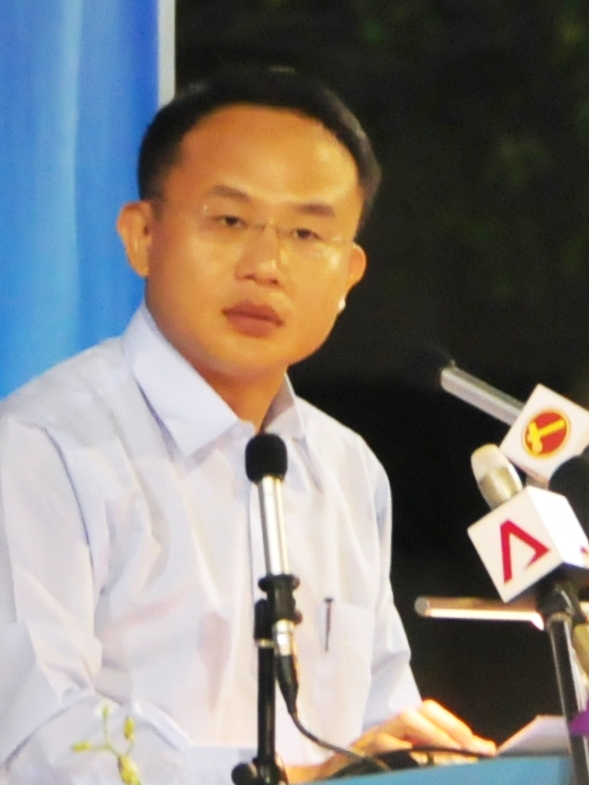
Yaw Shin Leong during his rally speech at Serangoon Stadium as a candidate of the Workers' Party of Singapore during the 2011 general election

During a parliamentary debate on 27 August 2008, the Prime Minister of Singapore, Lee Hsien Loong, asserted that since Singapore's system of elections focuses on political parties rather than on individual candidates, in the event of a parliamentary seat falling vacant in the middle of a term, the Prime Minister retains "full discretion as to when and whether to call a by-election as the vacancy does not affect the mandate of the government".

Yaw Shin Leong, a member of the Workers' Party of Singapore, was elected as a Member of Parliament (MP) for Hougang Single Member Constituency (SMC) at the 2011 general election. He was expelled from the party on 14 February 2012 for refusing to explain to the party leadership certain allegations of marital infidelity that had come to light. As a result, pursuant to Article 46(2)(b) of the Constitution of the Republic of Singapore, he lost his parliamentary seat which became vacant, leaving the residents of Hougang SMC unrepresented. This spurred the applicant, Madam Vellama d/o (daughter of) Marie Muthu, a voter resident in Hougang SMC, to commence judicial review proceedings in the High Court on 2 March 2012 to compel the Government to call a by-election. She sought a declaration as to the proper construction of Article 49(1) of the Constitution and a mandatory order requiring the Prime Minister to advise the President to issue a writ of election for Hougang SMC within three months from the date of the vacancy, or such other reasonable period as the Court deemed fit.

A week after Vellama's application, Prime Minister Lee Hsien Loong announced in Parliament that he intended to call a by-election in Hougang SMC but had yet to decide on its timing. On 2 April 2012, the High Court granted Vellama leave to apply for judicial review. On 9 May 2012, the President, acting on the advice of the Prime Minister, issued a writ of election for a by-election in Hougang SMC. The by-election was held on 26 May 2012, and Png Eng Huat of the Workers' Party was returned to the seat for the constituency.

Vellama subsequently abandoned her application for the mandatory order but proceeded with her application for the declaration in the High Court. On 1 August 2012, the High Court dismissed her application. Dissatisfied, she appealed to the Court of Appeal which dismissed her appeal on 5 July 2013. However, in an obiter dictum, the Court of Appeal agreed with her interpretation of Article 49(1) of the Constitution rather than the Prime Minister's interpretation.

== Decisions of the High Court ==
=== Preliminary issue ===
Before a person can apply to the High Court for a prerogative order such as a mandatory order, he or she must be granted leave to do so by the Court. The requirement for leave is a preliminary step that helps to sieve out "groundless or hopeless cases at an early stage" and "prevent a wasteful use of judicial time and to protect public bodies from harassment". Leave will be granted if the Court is satisfied of the following:

- The matter complained of is susceptible to judicial review.
- The applicant has sufficient interest or standing in the matter.
- The evidence shows a prima facie case of reasonable suspicion that the Government has acted unlawfully.

However, as prerogative orders are discretionary remedies, the Court retains discretion to refuse leave if the circumstances warrant it.

Justice Philip Pillai found that on the facts the first two limbs of the test were obviously satisfied as it was undisputed that "the matter relates to the performance of powers and duties which involve a public element" and that "the applicant has sufficient interest in the matter". As for the third requirement, the judge held that it posed a very low threshold for leave. Consequently, based on the material before the court, it had been satisfied. He therefore granted leave for the merits of the case to be heard.

=== Substantive issue: interpretation of Article 49(1) ===
In the subsequent High Court hearing where the substantive issues were heard, Justice Pillai held that Article 49(1) of the Constitution does not mandate that the Prime Minister call a by-election to fill a casual vacancy arising in an SMC. The Article states:

Filling of vacancies 49.— (1) Whenever the seat of a Member, not being a non-constituency Member, has become vacant for any reason other than a dissolution of Parliament, the vacancy shall be filled by election in the manner provided by or under any law relating to Parliamentary elections for the time being in force.

The judge was persuaded that the expression shall be filled by election in the Article referred to a process and not an event. He approached the interpretation of the Article on three modes of analysis – textual, contextual and historical. The High Court's textual analysis considered Article 66 of the Constitution which provides for general elections to be held three months after the dissolution of Parliament. Article 66 states that "[t]here shall be a general election", whereas Article 49(1) merely states that a vacancy "shall be filled by election". In Justice Pillai's view, the absence of the word an before the word election in Article 49(1) suggested that the Article was merely stating the process by which a parliamentary vacancy should be filled and not an event that must be held, unlike Article 66.

The judge's contextual approach afforded more weight to his reasoning that Article 49(1) provides for the process for the filling of vacant seats for elected MPs. In his opinion, the placement of Article 49 in Part VI of the Constitution is significant, as that Part "prescribes different rules for different types of Members, and [similarly] different processes for filling each type of Member vacancies".

Justice Pillai's historical consideration of Article 49 centred on section 51 of the Singapore Colony Order in Council 1955, which he noted was the original source of Article 49(1). Section 51(1) of the 1955 Order in Council specified that a vacated seat of a Nominated Member of the Legislative Assembly "shall be filled by appointment by the Governor". Section 51(2) stipulated that the vacated seat of an Elected Member of the Assembly "shall be filled by election". In the judge's opinion, there was no ambiguity in the meaning of the expression shall be filled by election in section 51(2) because section 51 was clearly referring to the process of filling a seat and not an event. The judge opined that subsequent constitutional provisions originating from section 51(2) of the 1955 Order in Council that contained the same expression must have the same meaning unless the text was intentionally changed. Accordingly, the High Court dismissed Madam Vellama's application.

== Decision of the Court of Appeal ==
=== Preliminary issue: standing ===
Vellama appealed the High Court's decision to the Court of Appeal. Before the High Court, Vellama's standing to bring the suit was not disputed. However, during the Court of Appeal hearing, the Attorney-General contended that she no longer possessed standing as the by-election in Hougang SMC had been held. Accordingly, the Court had to consider whether standing should be regarded as having crystallized at the point the proceedings were initiated, or treated as an ongoing issue to be determined at every stage of the proceedings.

==== Whether standing is open to review ====
The judgment of the Court of Appeal was delivered by Judge of Appeal Chao Hick Tin. The Court cited the decision of the House of Lords in Inland Revenue Commissioners v. National Federation of Self-Employed and Small Businesses Limited (1981), in which the judges unanimously decided that the lower court's decision on standing was open to review on appeal. This conclusion was justified as the court at the leave stage might not have the full evidence to make a conclusive determination of the applicant's standing.

The proposition in the National Federation case has been endorsed in subsequent United Kingdom cases. In the light of such "overwhelming authority", the Court held that the issue of Vellama's standing was not limited to a preliminary determination at the initiation of proceedings, but was subject to review until the Court had arrived at a final determination.

==== Whether Vellama continued to have standing ====
The Court of Appeal proceeded to consider whether Vellama still retained standing given that the Hougang by-election had already been held — a pertinent change in circumstances that affected the very basis of her application.

===== United Kingdom position =====
The Court discussed the position under English law extensively. Legislative amendments made in 1977 established a single test for standing applicable to all remedies which only required an applicant to have a "sufficient interest in the matter to which the application relates". Currently, the Courts of England and Wales have wide scope to grant leave for judicial review to be brought where there is a public interest element in the proceedings, even though the applicant may not be personally affected. Although Singapore has not adopted the 1977 UK legislative changes, the Singapore Court of Appeal noted that English cases based on this law were "nevertheless instructive" in determining an applicant's standing after changed circumstances.

The Court then considered a line of English cases where the application was dismissed for a lack of standing. In R. v. Legal Aid Board, ex parte Hardiman, an application was dismissed after leave was granted due to a change of factual circumstances. The Court held that the principal relief sought would have been "entirely a purposeless exercise" for the applicant. Furthermore, in R. v. Head Teacher of Fairfield Primary School, ex parte W, the action was denied as there would be "no practical benefit" to the applicant.

On the contrary, there are some English cases where the application was allowed to proceed despite a change in circumstances. In Gibson v. Union of Shop, Distributive and Allied Workers (1968), the High Court of England and Wales allowed the action to proceed as there remained "a good ground of complaint, not of an academic character but involving substantial legal issues". Furthermore, the court in R. (Giles) v. Parole Board (2003) noted that even though the proceedings was entirely without any practical significance for the applicant, he had raised a matter of public importance which affected the liberty of other persons. Even though the application was "strictly moot", the House of Lords held that the application was "rightly held to raise an important point of principle".

In summary, when an application no longer has any practical significance to the applicant after an important change in circumstances, English courts are generally reluctant to find that the applicant continues to have standing. However, an exception to this is when there are compelling issues of public interest so much so that "a large number of similar cases exist or are anticipated and will need to be solved in the near future".

===== Singapore position =====
The leading local authority on the requirements for standing is Karaha Bodas Co. L.L.C. v. Pertamina Energy Trading Ltd. (2005). Although this was a private law case, in Tan Eng Hong v. Attorney-General (2012) the Court of Appeal applied the Karaha Bodas test to a constitutional judicial review case. Three basic propositions were distilled:

- The applicant must have a "real interest" in bringing the action.
- There must be a "real controversy" between the parties to an action for the court to resolve.
- The declaration must relate to a right which is personal to the applicant and which is enforceable against an adverse party to the litigation.

In Tan Eng Hong, the Court had generally affirmed the English position. In cases where a declaration will be "of value to the parties or to the public", a court may still continue to hear the case even though "the facts on which the action is based are theoretical". In so holding, the Court seemed to suggest that the first two limbs of the Karaha Bodas test would be concurrently satisfied since "it can be logically said that where there is a real legal interest in a case being heard, there is a real controversy to be determined".

Tan Eng Hong appeared to stand for the proposition that only the first and second limbs of the Karaha Bodas test are required, notwithstanding the lack of a violation of a personal right. However, in Vellama the Court of Appeal qualified the proposition and cautioned that Tan Eng Hong must be viewed in its proper context. The applicant in Tan Eng Hong was originally charged under section 377A of the Penal Code, but the charge was dropped and substituted with one for a lesser offence, which he pleaded guilty to. Although this arguably rendered his challenge to the constitutionality of section 377A theoretical, the application was still of "great practical significance" to him. Given the applicant's sexual orientation, so long as the constitutionality of section 377A was not decisively settled, a similar act committed by him could possibly attract prosecution. Therefore, the applicant's personal rights were affected. Thus, there was no contradiction between the adoption of the English position and the third requirement of the Karaha Bodas test in Tan Eng Hong.

===== Private v. public rights =====
In Vellama, the Court of Appeal then considered the nature of the right allegedly violated in the third requirement of the Karaha Bodas test. Although private citizens can bring actions to defend both private and public rights, the test for standing changes depending on the nature of the right contended.

Tan Eng Hong had approved the decision of the Supreme Court of Malaysia in Government of Malaysia v. Lim Kit Siang (1988) which distinguished between a private and public right. A public right is one held and vindicated by public authorities, while a private right is one which is held and vindicated by a private individual.

The Singapore Court of Appeal endorsed the reasoning in Boyce v. Paddington Borough Council (1902) which explained the applicable test for standing regarding public rights. Since public rights are shared by everyone in common because they arise from public duties owed by public authorities to the general class of persons as a whole, an applicant must prove "special damage" peculiar to himself or herself to distinguish his or her claim from those of other potential litigants in the same class. The Court justified the need for special damage in cases involving public rights to prevent frivolous or vexatious actions. Otherwise, courts will be swamped by an array of actions raised by "mere busybodies and social gadflies, to the detriment of good public administration" where the burden of bearing costs may not be a sufficient deterrence.

===== Meaning of "special damage" =====
As Tan Eng Hong involved a case of private rights, there was little elaboration on the principles on standing regarding public rights. Thus, in Vellama the Court of Appeal took the opportunity to explain the applicable principles regarding the need to prove "special damage" for applicants asserting a violation of public rights.

The Court noted that there is "no categorical answer" as to what constitutes special damage. The Court considered the view of Peter Cane, an English academic, who had argued that special damage was either damage to the common interests to all members of the public but suffered to a greater degree by the applicant, or damage qualitatively different from that suffered by the public. The Court also agreed with the High Court of Australia's decision in Australia Conservation Foundation Inc. v. Commonwealth (1980) which equated the special damage criterion to a requirement for "special interest" in the subject matter of the action. However, special interest cannot be a "mere intellectual or emotional concern". If the applicant's action succeeds, he or she must gain some advantage "other than the satisfaction of righting a wrong, upholding a principle or winning a contest". If the application fails, he or she must suffer some disadvantage "other than a sense of grievance or a debt for costs".

Thus, upon a review of the pre-1977 English and present-day Australian case law, the Court of Appeal concluded that special damage is not limited to actual pecuniary loss, and it is not required that the applicant alone has suffered damage. An applicant asserting a violation of a public right must show that his "personal interests are directly and practically affected over and above the general class of persons who hold that right". The Court declined to offer more specific guidelines as the special damage requirement is necessarily fact sensitive, dependent on individual cases.

===== Application to the facts =====
The Court of Appeal held that the first and second limbs of the Karaha Bodas test were satisfied. Although the Hougang by-election had been held, rendering the basis for Vellama's application factually moot, there were a real interest and real controversy at hand. The public undoubtedly had an interest in the outcome of the case as "casual vacancies can arise from time to time whereupon the issue will become real". Regarding the third requirement of the Karaha Bodas test, the Court did not expressly decide whether a private right was involved as the Attorney-General did not raise this issue. Even though Vellama first brought the action as a voter who had been directly affected by being resident in an unrepresented constituency, the Court noted that there was "considerable doubt" whether a private right had been violated as the Prime Minister had expressed an intention to call a by-election.

After the by-election was held, Vellama's basis for bringing the action was rendered factually moot. Thus, she could only claim a public right, rendering her "no different from any other citizen interested in the proper construction of Art 49". On the facts, Vellama was unable to show any special damage or special interest over and above that enjoyed by other members of the public in having the case heard; her interest was no more than a "general desire to have Art 49 interpreted by the court". Thus, the Court dismissed the appeal on the basis of Vellama's lack of standing.

=== Substantive issue: interpretation of Article 49(1) ===
Even though Vellama's appeal was dismissed on the ground of lack of standing, the Court of Appeal went on to clarify the substantive issue regarding the interpretation of Article 49(1) of the Constitution.

==== Historical background ====
The current Article 49 in the Constitution replaced Article 33 of the 1963 Constitution of the State of Singapore, which applied when Singapore was part of the Federation of Malaysia. The latter was first promulgated in the Third Schedule to the Sabah, Sarawak and Singapore (State Constitutions) Order in Council 1963 pursuant to Singapore's intent to join Malaysia as a constituent state.

The original version of Article 33 included a time-limit clause, which mandated that an election had to be held "within three months" of a seat of an MP becoming vacant for any reason except for the dissolution of Parliament. In 1963, the Singapore Legislative Assembly requested for the time-limit clause to be removed. However, the government of the United Kingdom turned the request down and Article 33 was not amended. The time-limit clause was only deleted from Article 33 upon Singapore's separation from Malaysia by the Constitution (Amendment) Act 1965, and Article 33 was subsequently renumbered as Article 49 in the 1980 Reprint of the Constitution.

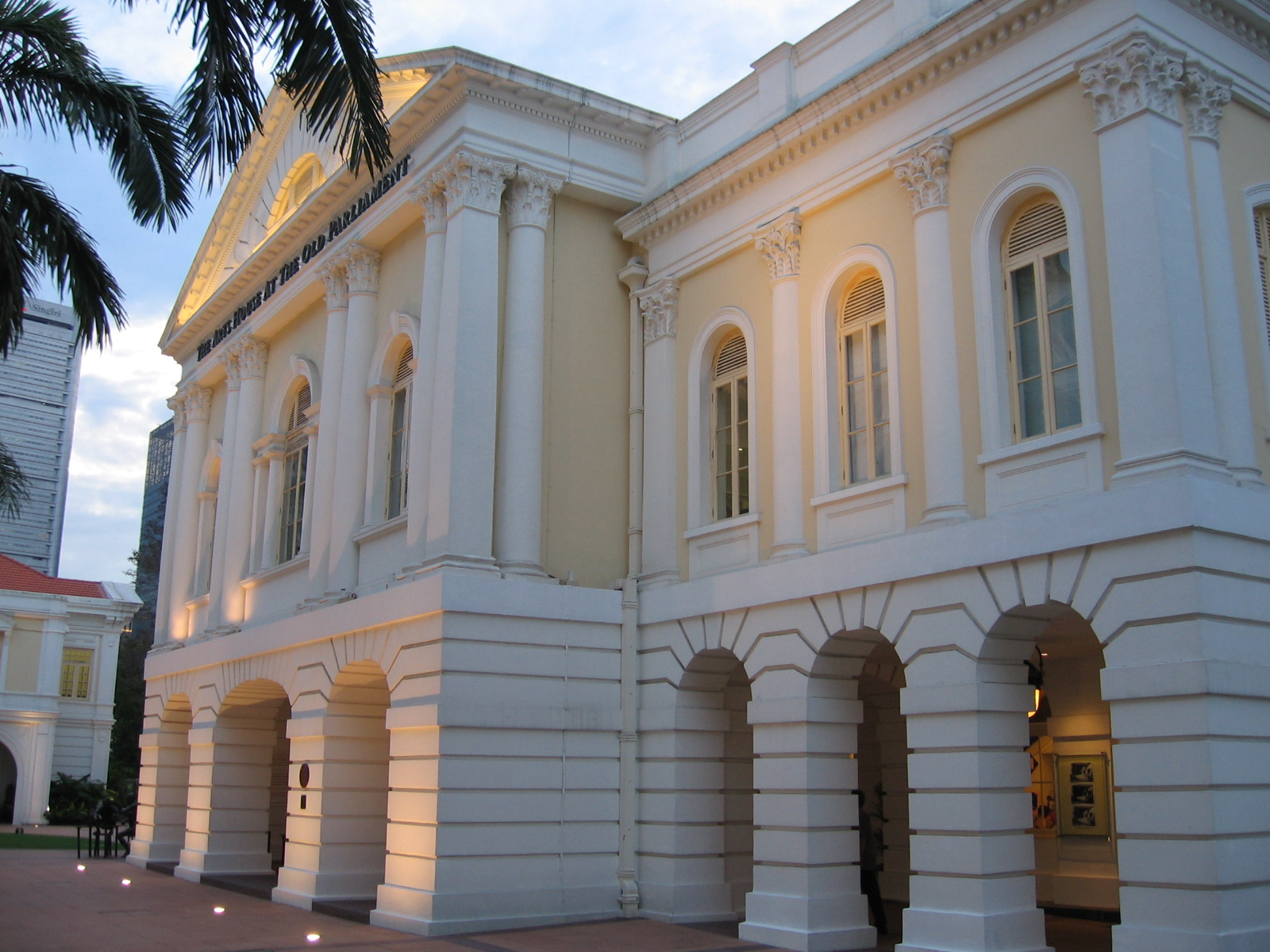
Old Parliament House in Singapore in February 2006. The building previously served as seat of the Legislative Assembly of Singapore.

In the Court of Appeal, both parties made submissions based on parliamentary debates which took place in 1963 regarding the Legislative Assembly's request to remove the time-limit clause in Article 33 to justify their positions. The Attorney-General argued that there was no constitutional duty for casual vacancies to be filled on the following grounds:

- In 1963, opposition MPs had argued against its removal – for example, Ahmad Jabri bin Mohammar Akib said the removal of the clause would leave future vacancies to "the whims and fancies of the Party in power". This implied that the majority stand and hence the law on by-elections in Singapore in 1963 was that the Prime Minister should have discretion as to whether a by-election had to be called in the event of casual vacancies.
- Other comments by opposition MPs also implied that the Prime Minister had the discretion as to whether to call a by-election. For example, in another parliamentary debate on 9 April 1963, Lim Yew Hock commented that the date of the by-election in Sembawang "could be June, it could be July, it could not even be held at all".
- The 1963 debates had to be viewed in the context of the Sembawang casual vacancy in 1962. While the Prime Minister Lee Kuan Yew had informed the Legislative Assembly that a by-election would be held soon after the electoral registers had been updated, the fact that a general election was held five months after Lee's statement instead of a by-election showed that there was no constitutional duty for casual vacancies to be filled.

On the other hand, Vellama argued it was not possible to extrapolate a principle of unfettered discretion from the fact that no by-election was called in Sembawang. She submitted that the by-election had not been held solely because of logistical reasons. This was seen from how the Singapore Legislative Assembly Elections (Temporary Provisions) Bill provided for a time extension for the revision of the electoral registers for 1962.

==== Prime Minister has no unfettered discretion under Article 49(1) ====
The Court of Appeal analysed the High Court's textual and historical interpretation of Article 49(1), and also considered the role of an MP. The Court found that Article 49(1) does place a duty upon the Prime Minister to call a by-election to fill casual vacancies. However, this only applies to SMCs since a special provision for the calling of by-elections for GRCs exists in section 24(2A) of the Parliamentary Elections Act. The Court's analysis involved answering the following questions:

- Whether the Prime Minister has unfettered discretion to advise the President to issue a writ of election to fill a casual vacancy of an elected Member.
- Whether he can delay the tendering of such advice indefinitely, or even declare that he is not going to fill the vacancy even if Parliament is not dissolved.

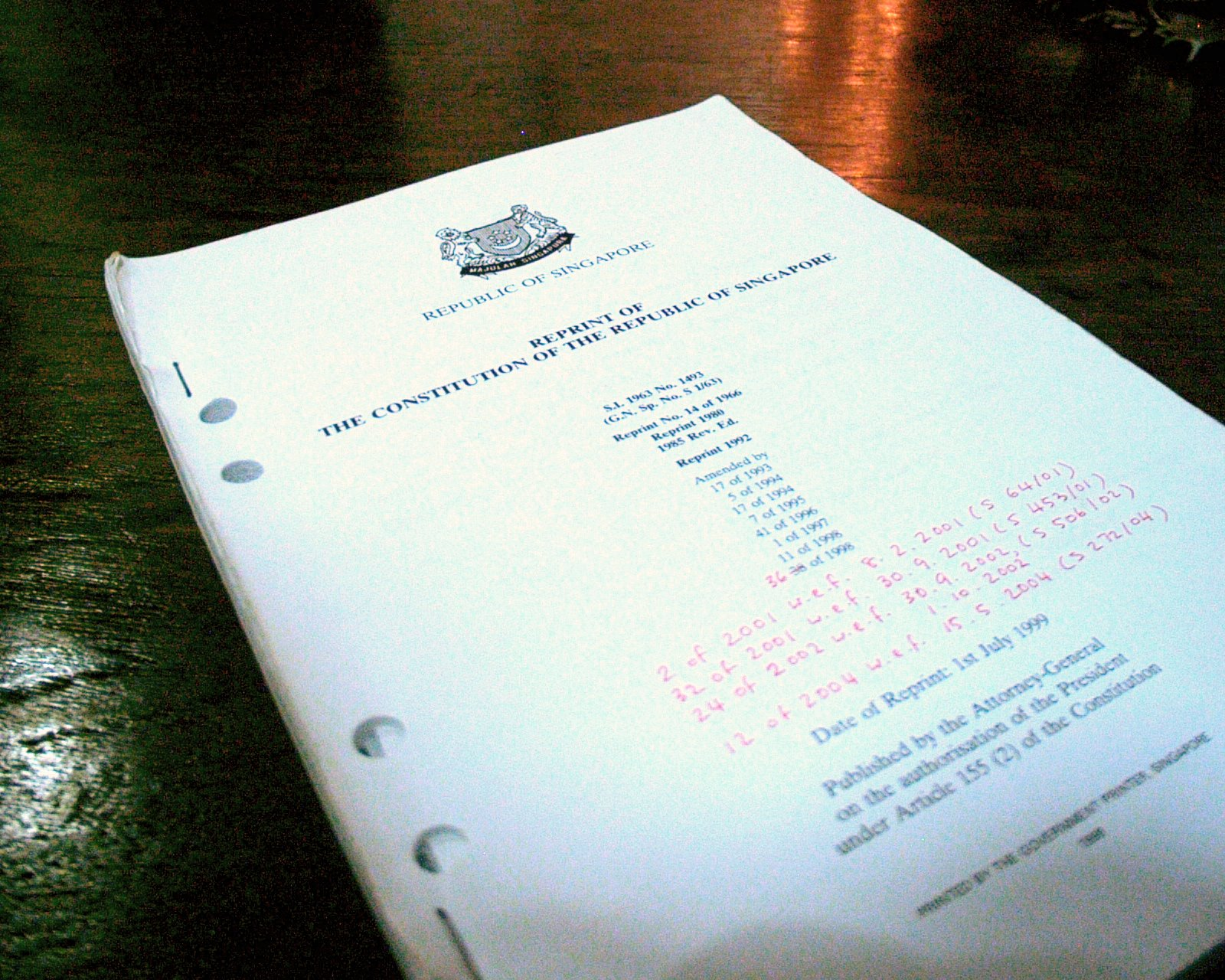
The 1999 Reprint of the Constitution of Singapore

===== Textual interpretation =====
The Court of Appeal rejected the High Court's textual interpretation of Article 49(1) because it failed to see how the presence of absence of the word an could resolve the questions. The Court believed that even if the word election was describing a process, this interpretation on its own would not answer the question of whether the Prime Minister had unfettered discretion. As such, the omission or inclusion of the word an did not add value to the understanding of Article 49(1), given that the phrase shall be filled by election was not any clearer than shall be filled by an election in determining the issue. Further, the phrase shall be filled by election is capable of being read in a "double-barrelled sense", meaning that it could in fact refer to both an event and process at the same time.

The Court of Appeal noted that the word shall is a mandatory verb, and that the key to the questions lay with that word rather than the word election in Article 49(1). The Court held that the High Court's textual emphasis on the word election had actually substantially modified the meaning of Article 49. This would lead to the less definitive construction that a vacancy may be filled and, if so, it shall be filled by election.

===== Analysis of the historical development =====
The Court of Appeal held that while both parties had relied heavily on the subtexts of statements made in the 1963 parliamentary debates, "one should not read too much into [them]". This was because the phrase shall be filled by election itself is inherently filled with ambiguity. The Court noted that no member of the ruling party, including the then Prime Minister Lee Kuan Yew, had ever denied there was a constitutional obligation to call a by-election to fill a casual vacancy. Instead, the 1963 debates had only focused on the time-frame within which such by-elections should be called.

It was the Court's opinion that it was likely that the sequence of events following the Sembawang vacancy was the motivating factor for the Legislative Assembly's proposal to remove the time-limit clause from Article 33 in 1965, on grounds that it "should no longer apply". However, the Court found it difficult to rely on the Sembawang vacancy as a historical precedent to conclude that there was no constitutional duty to fill casual vacancies. This was because no express statements to that effect were made at that point in time. Also, the delay in holding a by-election was actually a result of the electoral registers being updated. The failure to call the Sembawang by-election could thus at most be seen as an example of the discretion vested in the Prime Minister to call for either a by-election or a general election. Finally, the Court noted that legislative interventions throughout the years showed that there was no consensus as to the meaning of shall be filled by election.

===== MP as the representative of the people =====
The Court of Appeal stated that Singapore follows the Westminster system of government under which a voter at a general election performs a dual function: he votes a candidate into Parliament as an MP for a constituency and as a member of the political party that the voter seeks to return to power as the government. Despite some modifications to the Westminster model in Singapore, the Court held that the basic character of an elected MP in Singapore as the citizen's representative remained unchanged.

The Judges of Appeal felt that since the authority of the Government emanates from the people, every voter is entitled to have a member representing them and speaking on their behalf in Parliament. As such, the Court felt that an MP is "not just the mouthpiece but the voice of the people of the constituency". This is especially the case in a Single Member Constituency where voters only have a single representative in Parliament. The court thus felt that Article 49 does impose a duty upon the Prime Minister to call a by-election to fill casual vacancies in SMCs, unless he intends to call a general election in the near future.

==== Exercising the Article 49 discretion with "all convenient speed" ====
After holding that the Prime Minister does not have unfettered discretion to indefinitely postpone the holding of an election to fill a casual vacancy, the Court of Appeal went on to consider the time frame within which the Prime Minister must act. The Court referred to section 52 of the Interpretation Act ("IA") which provides: "Where no time is prescribed or allowed within which anything shall be done that thing shall be done with all convenient speed and as often as the prescribed occasion arises." Section 52 is relevant to the interpretation of Article 49(1) by virtue of section 2 of the IA which provides that the IA is applicable to "written law", including the Constitution.

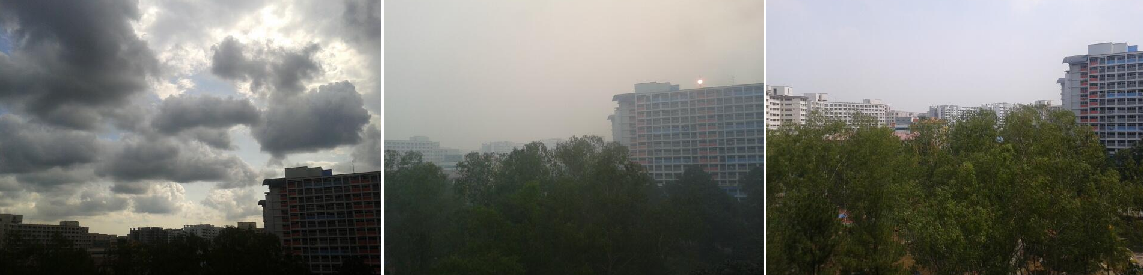
A series of photographs comparing the effects of the 2013 Southeast Asian haze (centre, 19 June) with how the same part of Singapore looked before and after the haze (left and right, 4 May and 23 June)

The Court drew a parallel between the common law concept of a reasonable time with that of "all convenient speed" in section 52 of the IA, and concluded that the Prime Minister is required to take into account all circumstances relevant to the act to be carried out, and this is not limited to logistical factors but also other policy matters including the physical well-being of the country. Two examples of such relevant considerations were the 2003 severe acute respiratory syndrome outbreak in Singapore and the 2013 Southeast Asian haze which was affecting Singapore at the time the vacancy arose. However, the Court did not wish to lay down specific considerations or factors that the Prime Minister is entitled to take into account. This was because it felt that the timing for the holding of an by-election is a dynamic issue and no predetermination of such considerations would be warranted.

The Court was also referred to the House of Lords case of R. v. Secretary of State for the Home Department, ex parte Fire Brigades Union (1995). Their Lordships held that the Home Secretary only had a duty to keep the implementation of a statutory scheme under active consideration until and unless Parliament decided to repeal the statute. The Singapore Court of Appeal distinguished ex parte Fire Brigades Union from the issue at hand on two grounds. First, the word shall in Article 49(1) indicated that the Prime Minister is under a duty to call an election to fill the vacancy, as opposed to the word may which appeared in the statute in ex parte Fire Brigades Union. Secondly, the Prime Minister's discretion under Article 49(1) is not solely and largely dictated by policy considerations, unlike the Home Secretary's discretion in ex parte Fire Brigades Union. Rather, in deciding when to call a by-election, the Prime Minister must bear in mind the equally important consideration of the interests of the people of the constituency in which a vacancy has arisen.

Therefore, while the Prime Minister has a measure of latitude in deciding when to hold a by-election, the Court reiterated that this does not mean that the Prime Minister is entitled to defer the calling of an election to fill a vacancy indefinitely, or to simply declare that he will not be advising the President to issue a writ of election. The Court opined that even if at a particular point in time the Prime Minister felt that it would not be appropriate to call for an election to fill a vacancy, he would still be compelled to review the circumstances from time to time and call one if and when the circumstances changed.

==== Power to call a by-election subject to judicial review ====
The Court of Appeal held that the Prime Minister's discretion under Article 49(1) of the Constitution as to the timing of an election to fill a casual vacancy is subject to judicial review. It is a basic requirement of the rule of law, that all discretionary power is subject to legal limits. However, the Court indicated that such judicial intervention would only be warranted in exceptional cases due to the fact-sensitive nature of the Prime Minister's discretion. Given the MP's role as the voice of the constituents, leaving a parliamentary seat vacant for too long could disenfranchise the residents of that constituency. Thus, there was a need to balance the Prime Minister's discretion as to the timing of the election and the rights of voters.

==== Application to the facts ====
The Court of Appeal held that Vellama's filing of the action barely two weeks after her MP's seat in Parliament fell vacant was premature because the Prime Minister had yet to make his stand on the matter. There was thus no basis to make any complaint against the Prime Minister as the application had pre-empted any decision by the Prime Minister. Further, the Prime Minister's decision to advise the President to file a writ of election on 9 May 2012 meant that thereafter there was no factual basis for the Court to rule on the reasonableness or otherwise of the Prime Minister not calling a by-election to fill the vacancy. As such, Vellama had no factual basis upon which to proceed with her case and this alone was sufficient to dismiss her case. On the other hand, since the Court agreed with Vellama that the Constitution requires the Prime Minister to fill casual vacancies arising in SMCs within a reasonable time, it ordered each party to bear its own costs.

== Reception of the case ==
=== Standing ===
While the earlier case of Tan Eng Hong had established the test for standing, namely that "[when] a public right was involved, the applicant must show that he had suffered special damage as a result of the public act being challenged and that he had a genuine private interest to protect or further", the Court of Appeal did not elaborate on the meaning of "special damage" in that case as it did not concern a public right.

The Court of Appeal applied its judgment in Vellama in the later case of Jeyaretnam Kenneth Andrew v. Attorney-General (2013). Expanding on the meaning of special damage, the Court noted "that 'special damage' might also possibly encompass those rare and exceptional situations where a public body has breached its public duties in such an egregious manner that the courts are satisfied that it would be in the public interest to hear it". In the National Federation case, the House of Lords also suggested the theoretical possibility that an ordinary taxpayer might have standing to bring a claim if a public authority had failed to perform its statutory duty, but it would have to be "a most extreme case". Similarly, erring on the side of caution, the Court specified that this is "a very narrow avenue which concerns only extremely exceptional instances of very grave and serious breaches of legality ... [and] should not in any way be taken as a spurring move towards the surge of public interest litigation".

The Court of Appeal in Jeyaretnam proceeded to emphasize that the principles in Boyce, which represent the view that an individual must have a sufficient personal stake in a matter to have standing, is still the predominant test for most cases. Boyce been unequivocally applied by the Court of Appeal in both Tan Eng Hong and Vellama, and it did not depart from this in Jeyaretnam.

In contrast, the English position pertaining to standing has become more liberal following the issuance in 1977 of Order 53, rule 3(5), of the Rules of the Supreme Court. As a result of this amendment, an applicant is only required to have "sufficient interest in the matter". This suggests that a wider discretion is conferred on the English courts to grant leave for judicial review applications to be brought since the presence of a public interest element in the matter suffices even though the applicant may not be personally affected. However, although the discretion is wide, it does not entail that judges can treat any interest as "sufficient". In the National Federation case, Lord Wilberforce cautioned that "the court must decide on legal principles". Lord Slynn of Hadley also opined in ex parte Salem that courts must exercise caution when establishing standing. Additionally, appeals which are academic between the parties should not be heard unless there is strong public interest in doing so.

As the only House of Lords decision on what constitutes sufficient interest, the National Federation case is instructive. The Court of Appeal of England and Wales held that the Federation's allegation gave it sufficient interest in the matter since the Federation was not a mere busybody but had a genuine grievance. However, this decision was overturned by the House of Lords as their Lordships were of the opinion that the Federation would only have standing if it was "a case of sufficient gravity", there was "some exceptionally grave or widespread illegality", or a breach of statutory duty due to "some grossly improper pressure or motive". Lord Diplock went further, adding that the Federation would have standing to seek judicial review of any ultra vires conduct.

Since the National Federation case, English courts have adopted a much broader approach towards standing. In R. v. Secretary of State for Foreign and Commonwealth Affairs, ex parte World Development Movement Ltd. (1994), a divisional court of England and Wales held that the following factors are relevant when determining whether litigants who lack any direct personal interest in a matter should be recognized as having standing:

- The importance of vindicating the rule of law.
- The importance of the issue raised.
- The likely absence of any responsible challenger.
- The nature of the breach of duty against which relief is sought.
- The role of the applicants in giving advice, guidance and assistance with regards to the subject matter of the dispute.

=== Interpretation of Article 49(1) ===
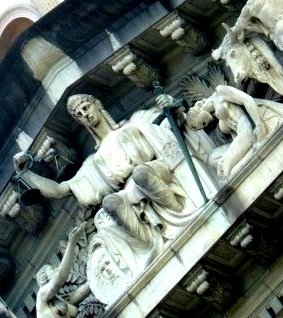
A figure of Lady Justice in the centre of Rodolfo Nolli's 1939 sculpture Allegory of Justice in the tympanum of the Old Supreme Court Building. The Vellama decision has been described as a demonstration of judicial independence from the political branches of government.

The Vellama decision was described as "a surprise to those used to a judicial stance that is fairly deferential towards the Government". The courts take such a deferential stance when dealing with certain types of decisions, often involving complex policy issues or national security. However, the court's statement indicating it would only intervene in "exceptional cases" while taking a "fact sensitive" approach represents a reservation of a fair amount of leeway for the Prime Minister in making such decisions.

It has also been noted that the Court of Appeal's approach to constitutional interpretation in the case reflects the approach taken by the Privy Council in Minister for Home Affairs v. Fisher (1979). Such an approach deems a constitutional instrument as sui generis and calling for principles of interpretation of its own because full recognition and effect must be given to fundamental rights and freedoms. The Court of Appeal's focus on the suggestion that residents have an entitlement or right to representation rather than on the purpose behind the statute has been described as embracing the Fisher approach and as a departure from the interpretive approach to constitutional interpretation espoused in section 9A of the Interpretation Act read with Article 2(9) of the Constitution. Section 9A requires a purposive approach to be taken when interpreting laws, and states that an interpretation of a law that would promote the purpose or object underlying the written law (whether that purpose or object is expressly stated in the written law or not) shall be preferred to an interpretation that would not promote that purpose or object. Article 2(9) states: "Subject to this Article, the Interpretation Act (Cap. 1) shall apply for the purpose of interpreting this Constitution and otherwise in relation thereto as it applies for the purpose of interpreting and otherwise in relation to any written law within the meaning of that Act".

The Vellama decision has also been described as enshrining the principle of judicial independence and impartiality in Singapore by dispelling unfounded beliefs by some members of the public that the judiciary is subject to influence by the legislative and executive branches of government. It has also been said that the decision serves as a definition and recognition of the rights of Singaporeans with regards to whether a by-election must be called. However, because Vellama's appeal was in fact dismissed for lack of standing, the holding of the Court with regards to the Prime Minister's discretion in calling a by-election was obiter dicta and, strictly speaking, is not binding on other courts faced with a similar decision.

== See also ==
- By-elections in Singapore
