= By-elections in Singapore =

Parliamentary elections between general elections

By-elections in Singapore are elections held to fill seats in the Parliament of Singapore that fall vacant in between general elections, known as casual vacancies. In the past, the Government of Singapore took the position that the Prime Minister had discretion whether or not a by-election should be called to fill a casual vacancy in a Single Member Constituency, and could leave a parliamentary seat unfilled until the next general election. However, in the case of Vellama d/o Marie Muthu v. Attorney-General (2013), which arose from a vacancy in Hougang Single Member Constituency, the Court of Appeal held that the Constitution of Singapore obliges the Prime Minister to call a by-election unless a general election is going to be held in the near future. However, a by-election need only be called within a reasonable time, and the Prime Minister has the discretion to determine when it should be held.

The law provides that a by-election need only be called in a Group Representation Constituency (GRC) if all the Members of Parliament (MPs) in the GRC vacate their seats. It has been argued that the law should be amended, otherwise electors living in a GRC where a vacancy has arisen will lack parliamentary representation, and with a missing MP the remaining MPs may find it difficult to deal with constituency matters. Also, if the MP who vacates their seat is from a minority community and the seat is not filled, as indeed occurred when Halimah Yacob resigned to stand for the presidency in 2017, this would defeat the purpose of the GRC scheme, which is to ensure a minimum level of minority representation in Parliament. In response, the Government has said that mandating all remaining MPs in a GRC to vacate their seats upon the loss of one minority MP effectively enables the latter to hold the former to ransom; the other MPs of the GRC continue to represent the electors and should be able to handle constituency matters without any problems; and as the purpose of GRCs is to ensure minority representation at the national rather than local level, the loss of one minority MP in one GRC should not make much difference in practice as there remain other minority MPs in Parliament.

Non-constituency Members of Parliament (NCMPs) are only declared to be elected at general elections, and there is no provision for the seat of an NCMP to be filled if it falls vacant. On the other hand, if a Nominated Member of Parliament (NMP) vacates their seat, a Special Select Committee of Parliament may nominate a replacement to be appointed by the President.

Due to the numerous aforementioned constraints imposed, by-elections in Singapore are rare and have only been held 11 times since the independence of Singapore in 1965, the latest being the by-election held in 2016 to fill a vacancy arising in Bukit Batok Single Member Constituency.

== History ==
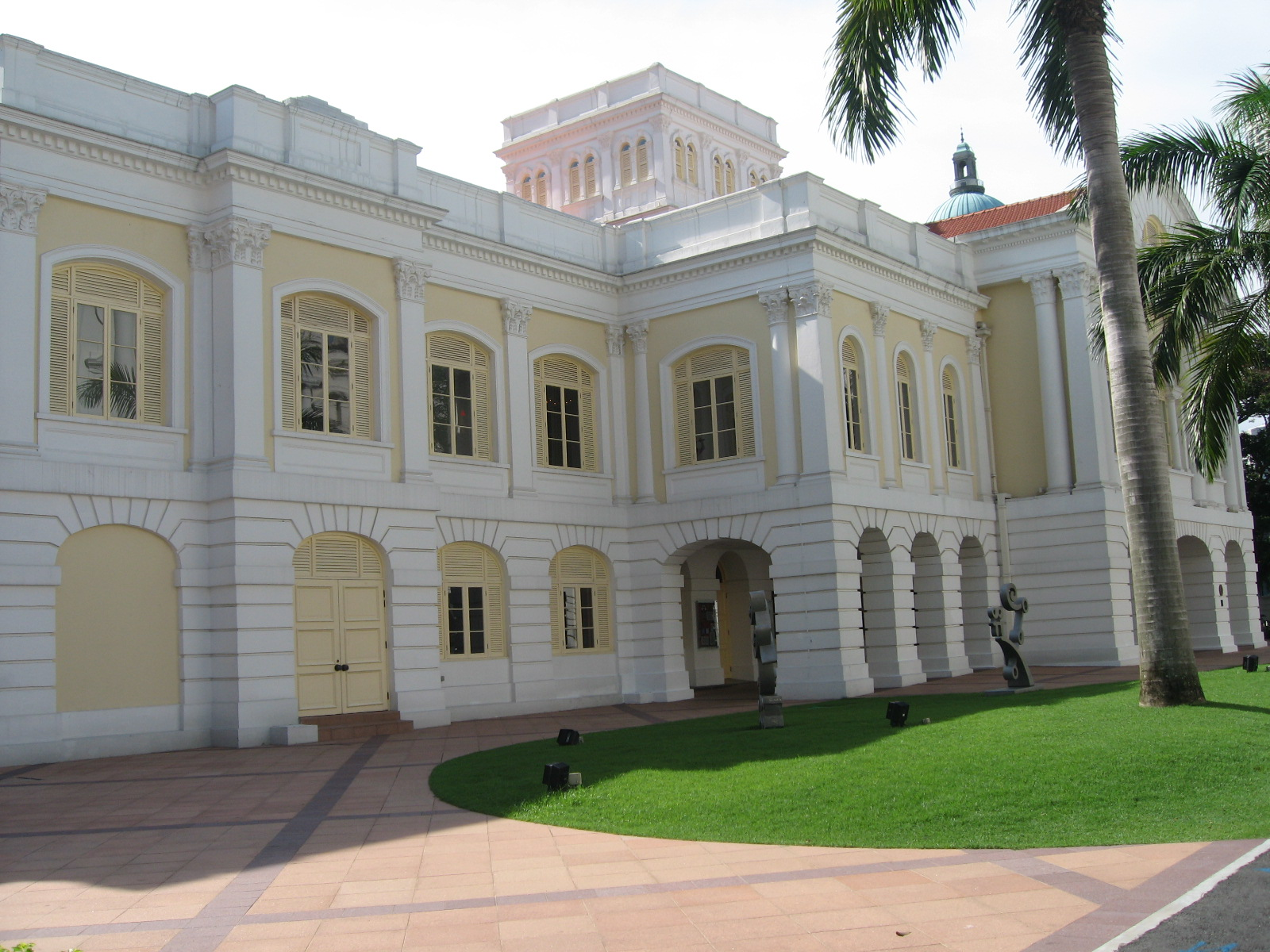
The Old Parliament House, Singapore, which was used by the Legislative Assembly of the Colony of Singapore when it was formed in 1955. The first provision governing by-elections appeared in Singapore's 1955 Constitution.

The Constitution of the Republic of Singapore embraces a system of representative democracy where Singapore citizens elect a government which governs on their behalf. Elections are held to elect democratic representatives who will then form the government.

A by-election is an election held to fill a parliamentary seat that falls vacant between general elections. Such an occurrence is called a casual vacancy. In Singapore, a constitutional provision governing by-elections was first included in the Singapore Colony Order in Council 1955, which was issued after a constitutional commission chaired by Sir George William Rendel recommended that the Legislative Council of Singapore be transformed into a Legislative Assembly with mostly elected members. Section 51(2) of the Order in Council stated: "Whenever the seat of an Elected Member of the Assembly becomes vacant, the vacancy shall be filled by election in accordance with the provisions of this Order." Section 44 of the Singapore (Constitution) Order in Council 1958 was a similar provision.

Subsequently, upon Singapore's merger with the Federation of Malaysia, a provision requiring by-elections to be held within a certain period was incorporated into the Constitution of the State of Singapore 1963. Article 33, which was similar to Article 54 of the Constitution of Malaysia, stipulated that a by-election had to be called within three months of a parliamentary seat being vacated in the middle of a parliamentary term:

Whenever the seat of a Member has become vacant for any reason other than a dissolution, the vacancy shall within three months from the date on which it was established that there is a vacancy be filled by election in the manner provided by or under any law for the time being in force in the State.

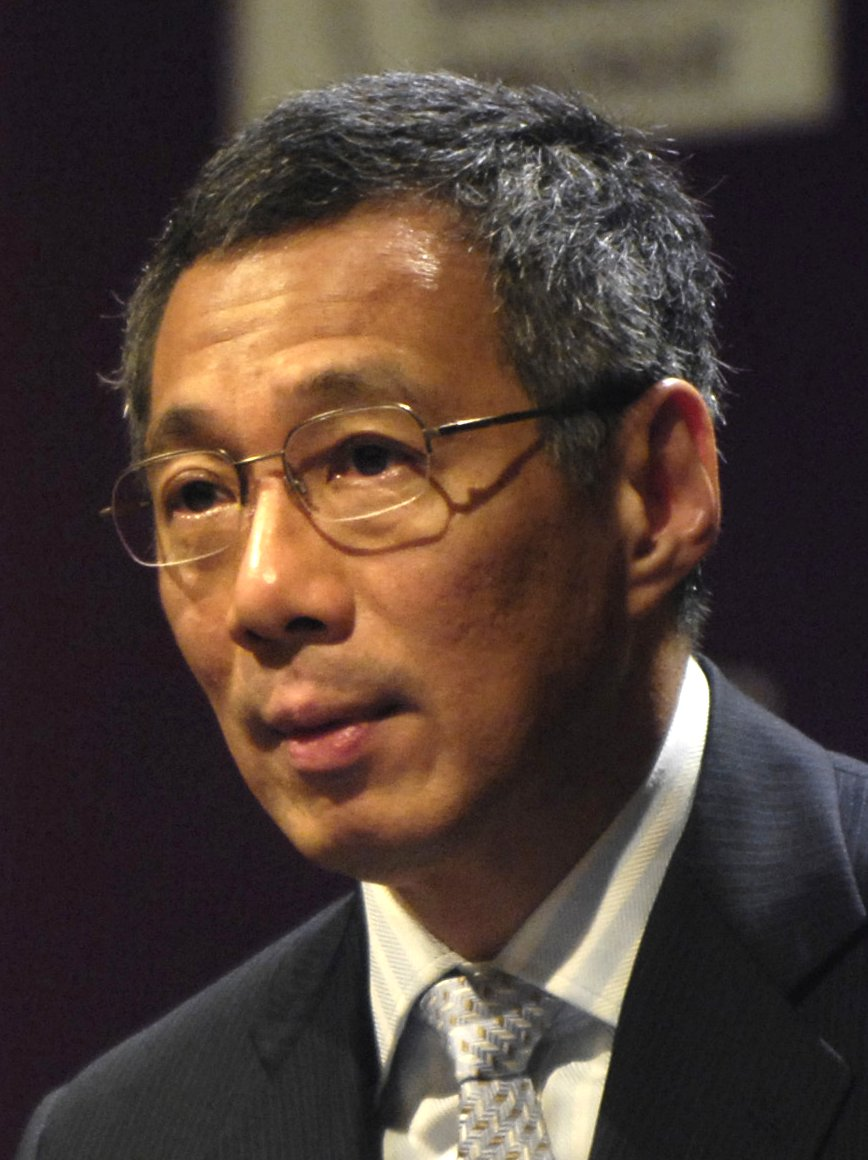
In August 2008, Prime Minister Lee Hsien Loong (seen here in June 2007) asserted during a parliamentary debate that the Constitution gave him discretion to decide whether or not a casual vacancy in Parliament should be filled

The clause "within three months from the date on which it was established that there is a vacancy" was removed after Singapore's independence on 9 August 1965, restoring Singapore's pre-merger position. In a 2008 parliamentary debate, Prime Minister Lee Hsien Loong explained that the amendment was motivated by the instability of the Legislative Assembly in Singapore's earlier history. Several assemblymen had crossed over from the ruling People's Action Party (PAP) to form an opposition party, the Barisan Sosialis, in 1961, leaving the PAP with a hairline majority of one member in the Legislative Assembly. The situation was made worse by the death of PAP minister Ahmad Ibrahim on 21 August 1962 as it destroyed the PAP's parliamentary majority, putting the party at risk of a motion of no confidence against it. Law professor Thio Li-ann has commented that in this scenario the obligation to hold a by-election within three months could determine which party held a majority of the Parliament or trigger a no-confidence motion that could "cause the demise of a sitting government". By-elections could thus "determine the fortunes of a political party, for good or ill", and, according to the Prime Minister, this was considered undesirable because it distracted the country from "other more pressing concerns" and therefore tended to cause instability and inefficiency.

Article 49(1) of the Constitution, which is the provision governing by-elections in Singapore today, does not stipulate a time limit within which a vacant parliamentary seat must be filled. During the 2008 parliamentary debate, the Prime Minister asserted that he had discretion to decide when a by-election should be called, if at all. He described the legal framework as his Government understood it as facilitating the efficient execution of the Government's policies, because political parties rather than individual candidates exist as the fundamental elements of the government. The focus is on the party delivering its promises, and because a vacancy in Parliament does not affect a party's mandate to rule, the vacancy need not be filled before the next general election. In 2013, the Court of Appeal held in Vellama d/o Marie Muthu v. Attorney-General (2013) that this was an incorrect interpretation of Article 49(1).

By-elections have been held 11 times since the independence of Singapore, the latest being the 2016 by-election to fill a vacancy arising in Bukit Batok Single Member Constituency.

== When a parliamentary vacancy arises ==
The seat of a Member of Parliament ("MP") is vacated in the middle of the term of office if he or she dies, or the MP:

- ceases to be a citizen of Singapore;
- ceases to be a member of the political party which he or she represented in the election;
- resigns by writing to the Speaker of Parliament;
- is absent without the Speaker's permission from parliamentary sittings or sittings of committees of Parliament that the MP is a member of for two consecutive months in which the sittings are held;
- is disqualified to be an MP according to Article 45 of the Constitution (which includes matters such as being of unsound mind, becoming bankrupt, and being sentenced in Singapore or Malaysia to prison for not less than a year or to a fine of not less than S$2,000); or
- is expelled from Parliament upon the exercise of its power to do so.

== Filling of casual vacancies ==
=== Elected Members of Parliament ===
In Singapore, elected MPs belong to either a Single Member Constituency ("SMC") or a Group Representation Constituency ("GRC"). SMCs are overseen by a single MP and GRCs by a team of between three and six MPs. For the purposes of the 2020 general election, there were 93 seats for elected MPs in Parliament organized into 14 SMCs and 17 GRCs.

==== Single Member Constituencies ====
Article 49(1) of the Constitution states:

Whenever the seat of a Member, not being a non-constituency Member, has become vacant for any reason other than a dissolution of Parliament, the vacancy shall be filled by election in the manner provided by or under any law relating to Parliamentary elections for the time being in force.

An issue that has arisen is whether this provision gives the Prime Minister discretion to call or not to call for by-elections when parliamentary seats are vacated.

===== 2008 parliamentary debate =====
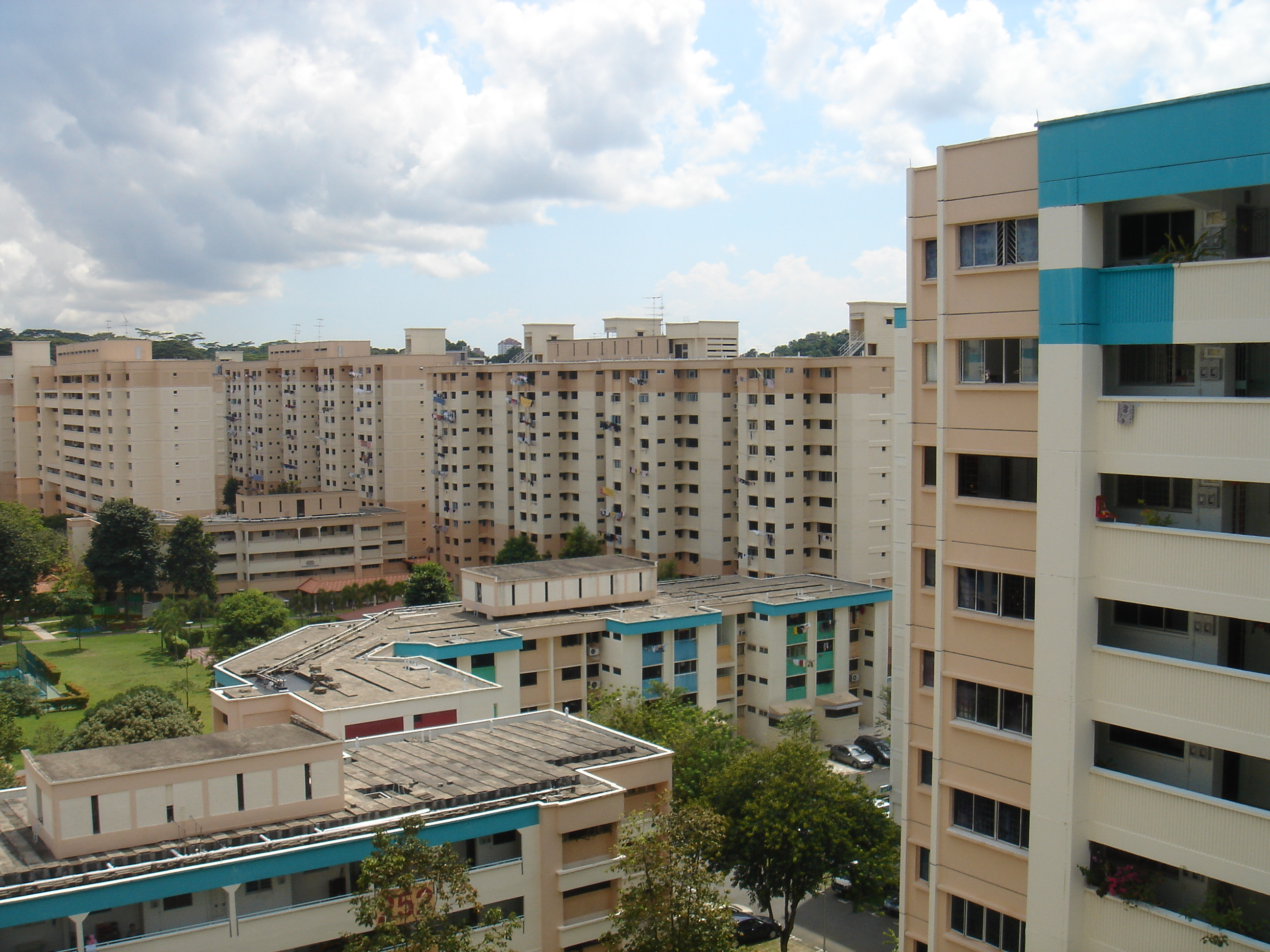
A public housing estate in Bukit Batok East in Jurong GRC, which was overseen by PAP MP Ong Chit Chung until his sudden death in July 2008. The following month, a debate took place in Parliament about whether by-elections should be made mandatory in some situations. Bukit Batok later became a single member constituency in the 2015 general election; another vacancy later occurred in March 2016, and precipitated a by-election in May that year.

Following the sudden death of Dr. Ong Chit Chung, an MP for Jurong GRC, on 14 July 2008, Nominated Member of Parliament (NMP) Thio Li-ann moved a motion in Parliament on 27 August in the following terms:

That this House affirms the importance of representative democracy and calls on the Government to fine-tune the electoral system by introducing amendments to the Parliamentary Elections Act such that (a) a writ for by-election shall be issued in the event (i) a Member of a Group Representation Constituency (GRC) belonging to a minority community within the terms of section 8A(1) of the Act vacates their seat for any reason; (ii) half or more of the Members elected on a group basis in relation to a GRC vacate their seats for any reason; or (iii) a Member of a single member constituency vacates their seat for any reason; and (b) all by-elections shall be called within three months from the date of vacancy unless the parliamentary term is due to expire within six months from the date of vacancy.

Thio expressed concerns that residents in an SMC would be left without representation in Parliament if their MP vacated their seat in Parliament. Although if it was a PAP MP whose seat was vacated another PAP MP in an adjacent ward could take over temporarily, this would not be possible if it was an Opposition ward that lost its MP because of the small number of constituencies held by the Opposition. In her view, "[a]s a matter of basic fairness, the law should not favour one political reality. It should provide for all contingencies, to ensure that voters in a ward do not suffer 'MP-lessness' by being denied parliamentary representation."

Thio said since the calling of by-elections should be governed by a rules-based regime, by-elections should be called within a specific time frame. She argued that a clear rule regulating discretion as opposed to giving political leaders absolute discretion in the matter would promote certainty and serve to uphold the rule of law, which helps to ensure a sound economic environment. Absolute discretion might result in arbitrary abuse without oversight.

Loo Choon Yong, another NMP who co-sponsored the motion with Thio, submitted that all by-elections should be called within three months from the date of the vacancy unless Parliament's term was due to lapse within six months of that date. He reiterated that if a by-election were not held, voters living in the affected constituency would be deprived of parliamentary representation, and "[t]he longer the vacancy remains unfilled, the greater the inequality to these voters". He submitted that "[l]eaving the timing of by-election vague and ambiguous is not a good practice ... [W]e should therefore amend it to give greater certainty, clarity and transparency."

In response, Prime Minister Lee pointed out that Singapore's system of elections focuses on political parties rather than on individual candidates. Election candidates represent their respective political parties, and the party that attains the highest number of candidates elected into Parliament forms the government. In such a system, the governing party receives its mandate indirectly through its candidates that have been voted into Parliament. The Prime Minister thus retains "full discretion as to when and whether to call a by-election as the vacancy does not affect the mandate of the government".

===== Court rulings =====
The position asserted by the Prime Minister was scrutinized by the courts as a result of events leading to the 2012 by-election. Yaw Shin Leong, a Workers' Party member, had been elected as the MP for Hougang Single Member Constituency in the 2011 general election, but was expelled from his party on 14 February 2012 for failing to respond to allegations of marital infidelity. On 28 February 2012, the Speaker of Parliament announced in Parliament that, by reason of this expulsion, Yaw's seat had become vacant pursuant to Article 46(2)(b) of the Constitution.

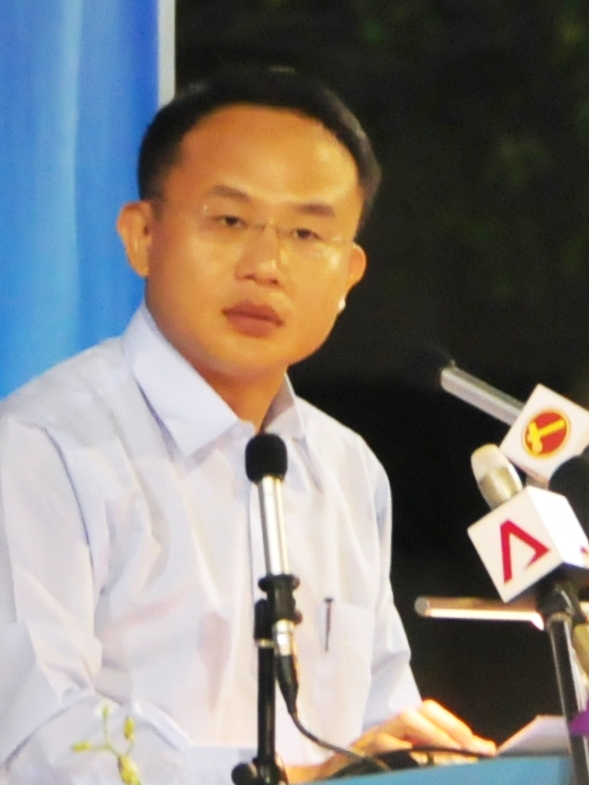
Yaw Shin Leong giving a speech in Serangoon Stadium as a Workers' Party candidate during the 2011 general election. He was duly elected, but his subsequent expulsion from the party led to a casual vacancy arising in Parliament, and court rulings on whether the Prime Minister had a discretion not to call a by-election.

On 2 March 2012, Hougang resident Vellama d/o Marie Muthu sought leave from the High Court to apply for declarations that the Prime Minister neither had unfettered discretion to decide whether to hold a by-election in her constituency; nor, if he called a by-election, to determine when it should be held. She argued that a by-election had to be held within three months of the casual vacancy arising or "within such reasonable time as this Honourable Court deems fit". Furthermore, she sought a mandatory order requiring the Prime Minister to call a by-election. In Vellama d/o Marie Muthu v Attorney-General (2012) the High Court dismissed Vellama's application, finding that although the word shall in Article 49(1) of the Constitution is mandatory in nature, the phrase shall be filled by election refers only to the process through which vacated seats of elected MPs should be filled, and not to the fact that the by-election itself must be held. It was not mandatory for the Prime Minister to call a by-election when the seat of an elected MP in an SMC was vacated. All the law required was that if a by-election was called, the vacancy was to be filled by an electoral process as opposed to some other process such as appointment. Consequently, there was no prescribed time limit within which a by-election had to be called.

The Court of Appeal disagreed with the High Court's conclusion. It held that the phrase shall be filled by election could be "read in a double-barrelled sense", meaning that Article 49(1) does not just require a casual vacancy to be filled using an election as a means, but also that the Prime Minister has an obligation to fill the vacancy. The Court noted that "a Member [of Parliament] represents and is the voice of his constituents. If a vacancy is left unfilled for an unnecessarily prolonged period that would raise a serious risk of disenfranchising the residents of that constituency". Although Article 49(1) does not specify the time limit for a by-election to be called, according to section 52 of the Interpretation Act:

Where no time is prescribed or allowed within which anything shall be done that thing shall be done with all convenient speed and as often as the prescribed occasion arises.

This, the Court of Appeal said, means that a by-election must be called within a reasonable time, taking into account all relevant circumstances. However, it is "impossible to lay down the specific considerations or factors which would have a bearing on the question as to whether the Prime Minister has acted reasonably for not ... calling a by-election to fill a vacancy", because when a by-election should be held is a "polycentric matter which would involve considerations which go well beyond mere practicality and the Prime Minister could justifiably take into account matters relating to policy, including the physical well-being of the country". Therefore, although "the Prime Minister's discretion as to the timing of an election to fill a casual vacancy is subject to judicial review, it is in the nature of such a fact-sensitive discretion that judicial intervention would only be warranted in exceptional cases". The Court also mentioned it is unnecessary to hold a by-election if the Prime Minister intends to call for a general election "in the near future".

==== Group Representation Constituencies ====
In Vellama, the Court of Appeal held that Article 49(1) of the Constitution does not require the Prime Minister to fill a casual vacancy that arises in a GRC because section 24(2A) of the Parliamentary Elections Act states that no writ of election can be issued unless all the MPs in a GRC have vacated their seats in Parliament.

In Wong Souk Yee v. Attorney General, the Court of Appeal similarly held that there is no requirement pursuant to Art 49(1) for a by-election to be called when a vacancy arises in a GRC, and noted that a vacancy in a GRC cannot be filled one-for-one in a single seat by-election, and no legal mechanism exists to compel the remaining members of a GRC to vacate their seats, which is a necessary prerequisite for a by-election in a GRC.

===== Lack of parliamentary representation =====
In 2008, following the vacancy that arose in Jurong GRC, law professor Yvonne Lee commented that the loss of one member of a GRC could mean a loss of mandate from the people by itself, because the MPs of a GRC are voted in "as a complete team". In her view, holding a by-election in a GRC in such a situation would allow the "political legitimacy of the GRC" to be maintained. A similar concern was expressed during a parliamentary debate on 6 July 1999 by Non-constituency Member of Parliament (NCMP) J. B. Jeyaretnam after the resignation of Choo Wee Khiang from Jalan Besar GRC. Raising the concern that the loss of one member in a GRC would result in voters receiving only a portion of the representation they had a constitutional right to, he said:

Under the Constitution as introduced by the ruling party itself, Jalan Besar GRC voters are entitled to four MPs in Parliament. That is their constitutional right. But now they have not got four MPs in Parliament. They have only three MPs in Parliament ... . Is that not a diminution of their constitutional right? ... Why should the voters of Jalan Besar be told: "Be content with the three-quarter tank in Parliament. You cannot have a full tank. We will give you a three-quarter tank."

In support of Jeyaretnam, Opposition MP Chiam See Tong claimed that the PAP government had introduced GRCs to reduce the likelihood that by-elections would be necessary. He said: "The people know for sure that the Government is already firmly in place and it cannot be toppled by a by-election. For this reason, Singaporeans are more amenable to vote the Opposition at a by-election and the PAP knows that." Noting that the PAP had dispatched Heng Chee How, an unsuccessful candidate in the 1997 general election, to assist with some of Choo's duties, Chiam argued that appointing a failed candidate to replace a resigned MP would not be the choice of the voters but that of the ruling party. "The essence of democracy is representation and choice. ... The voters at Jalan Besar GRC must be given their democratic right to choose their own representative in Parliament, [and it is] not [for the Government] to force one upon them."

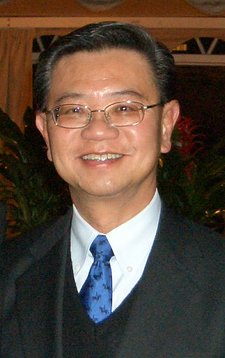
Wong Kan Seng, who was Minister for Home Affairs in March 2006. During a 1999 parliamentary debate, he said that when Singaporeans living in GRCs vote in a general election, they are aware that a casual vacancy that may arise need not be filled through a by-election.

In response, the Minister for Home Affairs and Leader of the House, Wong Kan Seng, raised two points. First, he argued that Singaporeans living in GRCs vote "with the knowledge that should a vacancy arise (before the next General Elections) such a vacancy need not be filled", since this was provided for in the law. He added that the constitutional rights of the voters had not been diminished nor the PAP's electoral mandate thwarted, as there were still MPs in the GRC to carry on with their roles. Secondly, on the issue of Heng acting as a "replacement", Wong recognized that the Government could not appoint a replacement MP to represent the voters. Heng would be there only for "training" purposes, to gain experience on how to work with the electorate, understand their concerns, and deal with their problems.

In the 2008 parliamentary debate where the issue of by-elections resurfaced, Prime Minister Lee's response to this issue centred around the philosophy that MPs are elected on a party platform. He explained that Singapore's elections were designed "to maximise the chances of a stable, effective government in between general elections". As mentioned above, the political party that forms the parliamentary majority is given the mandate to govern and produce results. This mandate continues until the next general election is called. The decision to call for by-elections is thus entirely up to the Prime Minister as any vacancy would not affect the Government's five-year mandate. As a result, MPs would also not be able to force by-elections at random in the midst of a parliamentary term, which would distract the country from "more pressing concerns".

In addition, Lee cited the past practice of MPs from neighbouring constituencies taking care of affairs in both SMCs and GRCs where casual vacancies had arisen. However, Thio has commented that these examples are based on the implicit assumption that political parties will always have more than one elected MP in Parliament. In her view, a "lacuna in the law" exists where a party has only one elected member. Should that member vacate their seat, in the event that a by-election is not called, it appears that an unelected member from the party who lacks a popular mandate would have to take care of the constituency temporarily.

===== Manpower constraints =====
Another issue involves practical fears of manpower constraints. In the light of section 24(2A) of the PEA, by-elections need not be called in a GRC unless all the MPs for that constituency have vacated their seats in Parliament. This means that other members in a GRC team "must pick up the slack" caused by a member who vacates their seat mid-term, and continue serving electoral districts with less than their full complement of MPs.

Thio Li-ann has raised the concern that such an approach reduces the efficiency and effectiveness of a GRC, because its resources are unfairly stretched. She has argued it is "inconsistent not to require by-elections within a set period where a vacancy depletes team strength", since GRC seats are allocated based on the size of electoral wards in the first place. Furthermore, the size of GRC teams were increased from three to four in 1991 and to six in 1997, which in her view leads to a logical implication that a full GRC team is needed to serve larger electoral wards. In response to these fears, MP Halimah Yacob said during the 2008 parliamentary debate that the loss of one member does not lead to a significant decrease in efficiency and effectiveness, and a fear of manpower constraints should not by itself be sufficient to trigger a by-election:

There were some suggestions that perhaps because there are so many residents and only four MPs, some of their interests and welfare will be overlooked. ... In fact, I think all the four MPs are more than able to take care of their needs ... as far as the Jurong GRC is concerned, the level of service to them is completely not affected and, at the end of the day, I must say that should be the core of parliamentary democracy.

===== Minority representation =====
A key objective of the GRC system is the representation of racial minorities in Parliament. Under the current legal framework, however, there is no obligation to hold a by-election when minority seats are vacated halfway through a term of office. Thio Li-ann has commented that leaving a minority seat unfilled until the next general election risks defeating the original purpose of GRCs.

In spite of this, the Singapore Parliament has found it unnecessary to have rules mandating a by-election when minority MPs vacate their seats. In the 2008 parliamentary debate, Prime Minister Lee stated that the number of minority MPs was well above the minimum, and it was unlikely that the number of minority MPs would fall below the minimum requirement in the near future. On a separate occasion, Deputy Prime Minister Tony Tan also promised that the PAP was prepared to field "more than two minority candidates per GRC ward" if this was necessary to maintain levels of minority representation. However, because no specific quotas exist as to the number of minority candidates required in Parliament, the promise to ensure that Parliament has a multiracial character has been criticized as based upon a "vague standard".

It appears that the Singapore Government inclines towards a discretionary rather than rules-based approach when it comes to by-election decisions. In support of this, Halimah has argued that the interests of minority communities are protected so long as other minority MPs are present. In her view, allowing by-elections to be triggered by minority members vacating their GRC seats will undermine the concept on which GRC is premised. Furthermore, the system was also designed to prevent an MP holding their GRC to ransom. If by-elections had to follow the vacation of every minority seat, minority MPs would possess significant power in determining the fates of GRCs; this was the argument raised by then Deputy Prime Minister Goh Chok Tong in Parliament when GRCs were originally introduced in 1988.

PM Lee responded that Thio and NMP Siew Kum Hong had raised too many theoretical contingencies for the Government to address. He argued that the Constitution and other laws cannot cover all of them, and instead the more practical step that the Government should employ is to address problems as they emerge, bearing in mind the long-term direction in which Singapore's political system should evolve.

Subsequently, when Halimah herself resigned from Parliament to stand in the 2017 reserved presidential election, leaving the minority seat in her GRC vacant, the Court of Appeal explicitly upheld the position that there is no obligation to hold a by-election when minority seats are vacated halfway through a term of office, as Parliament had considered the argument that this would permit minority MPs to hold their fellow MPs to ransom:

Parliament... had specifically considered the risk of minority representation being diminished in this situation, and had decided that this risk was an acceptable trade-off for preventing a Member of a GRC from otherwise being able to hold the rest of the Members of that GRC to ransom... To accept... this point would run contrary to Parliament's intention by importing into the GRC scheme a risk that Parliament had explicitly intended to avoid, in exchange for removing a risk that Parliament had explicitly expressed its willingness to accept.

===== Costs of a by-election =====
In support of the current legal framework, it has been said that holding by-elections without any pressing or pragmatic need would be "a waste of public funds and allow political mercenaries to appear from the cold". Each candidate at an election can spend up to $3.50 on each person on the Register of Electors, or $3.50 for each elector divided by the number of candidates in the group standing for election in a GRC.

=== Non-constituency Members of Parliament ===
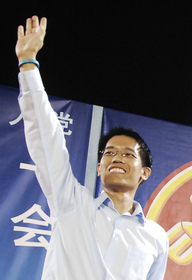
Gerald Giam, an NCMP during the 12th Parliament of Singapore, at a Workers' Party rally for the 2011 general election. NCMPs are only declared elected at general elections, and the law currently does not provide for casual vacancies arising in NCMPs' seats to be filled.

Non-constituency Members of Parliament ("NCMPs") are candidates at a general election who failed to win parliamentary seats, but who are later declared to have been elected into Parliament as the "best losers". To be eligible to be NCMPs, candidates must have attained at least 15% of the valid votes in the respective wards that they contested in. The number of NCMPs declared to be elected is nine less the number of opposition MPs who are returned to Parliament.

Article 49(1) of the Constitution provides that "whenever the seat of a Member, not being a non-constituency Member, has become vacant for any reason other than a dissolution of Parliament, the vacancy shall be filled by election ..." (emphasis added). Thus, on a plain reading, the Article precludes the holding of by-elections to replace NCMPs who have vacated their seats. Article 49(2)(b) states that the legislature may enact a law to provide for "the filling of vacancies of the seats of non-constituency Members where such vacancies are caused otherwise than by a dissolution of Parliament", but there is currently a dearth of such a law. In Vellama, the High Court said it was "clear that non-constituency Members can only be declared elected under the Parliamentary Elections Act", which suggests that at present NCMPs may only be appointed following general elections.

=== Nominated Members of Parliament ===
Nominated Members of Parliament ("NMPs") are apolitical MPs appointed by the President of Singapore upon nomination by a Special Select Committee of Parliament to provide non-partisan expertise during parliamentary debates. The Constitution provides that up to nine NMPs may be appointed for a term of two and a half years.

Article 49(2)(a) of the Constitution provides that if the seat of an NMP is vacated in the midst of the term of office, the legislature may by law stipulate how that seat is to be filled. Paragraph 4(2) of the Fourth Schedule to the Constitution goes on to provide that "[w]henever the seat of a nominated Member has become vacant for any reason other than a dissolution of Parliament or the expiry of his term of service, the Special Select Committee may, if it thinks fit, nominate a person for the President to appoint as a nominated Member to fill the vacancy". In Vellama the High Court noted that the use of the word may indicates it is not mandatory for a casual vacancy of an NMP's seat to be filled. The Special Select Committee has a discretion whether to nominate another person for the President to appoint as an NMP to fill the vacancy. It is also "abundantly clear" that the Constitution precludes the holding of by-elections to fill vacated NMP seats, since these seats are filled by appointment and not by election.

== By-election procedure ==
The by-election process is triggered in the same way as a general election – the President, acting on the Prime Minister's advice, issues a writ of election addressed to the returning officer. The procedure is as follows:

Sequence	Election procedure
1	The President, acting on the Prime Minister's advice, issues a writ of election to the returning officer. The writ specifies the date and places of nomination of the candidates.; The date of nomination must not be earlier than five days or later than one month from the date of the writ.
2	In the case of a by-election in a GRC, minority candidates must apply at least two clear days before nomination day for certificates stating that they are persons belonging to the Malay, Indian or some other minority community. The certificates will be issued not later than the day before nomination day.
3	Reports of all political donations received by candidates must be submitted at least two clear days before nomination day.; If the paperwork is in order, the Registrar of Political Donations will issue a political donation certificate not later than the eve of nomination day stating that the candidate has complied with the requirements of the law.
4	Nomination day
5	Polling day

In the event a by-election is called, NCMPs may run for election as MPs without relinquishing their parliamentary seats. The latter action is only necessary if they are elected as MPs. This is unlike NMPs, who have to vacate their seats to run as candidates in a by-election. It thus appears that NCMPs who unsuccessfully contest in by-elections may resume their Parliamentary seats. However, because no obligation to fill vacated NCMP seats exists, an opposition party which successfully fields an NCMP in a by-election is not entitled to have its previous NCMP seat filled by a new individual.

== Historical By-elections ==
=== 1957 Cairnhill by-election ===
Former Chief Minister of Singapore David Marshall and then Member of the Legislative Assembly for Cairnhill resigned his seat on 30 April 1957. In the ensuing by-election, the ruling Labour Front Government only polled 19.23% compared to 47.58% in the general elections held two years back - a swing of 28.35%. The government, as a result, lost the seat to the newly formed LSP - an amalgamation of the Progressive Party and Democratic Party.

=== 1961 Hong Lim and Anson by-elections ===
By 1961, the ruling PAP was on the verge of collapse due to internal rivalries from the leftists and from former Minister for National Development, Ong Eng Guan. Ong had won the Hong Lim Constituency with 77.02% of the vote in a four-way contest in 1959. After his dismissal as Minister, he resigned from the PAP and his seat on 29 December 1960. In the subsequent by-election, Ong (contesting as an independent) polled 73.31% of the votes, effecting a loss of 50.33% of the votes for the ruling PAP. This represented the largest loss of votes for an incumbent party in a by-election.

On 20 April 1961, then PAP Member of the Legislative Assembly Baharuddin Ariff died, thus vacating his seat of Anson. Ariff had won the seat with 60.75% in a 5-way contest in 1959. However, the subsequent by-election saw the Workers' Party Chairperson and former Chief Minister, David Marshall winning 43.32% of the votes with PAP coming in second - polling 36.75% (a loss of 24.00%).

The two by-election losses came at a time when PAP was struggling to keep its hard-fought majority in the Legislative Assembly due to strong internal rivalries and defections by the leftists. Due to their small majority, the by-elections were critical for the government's survival then.

=== 1981 Anson by-election ===
Prior to the 1991 constitutional amendments, the President of Singapore (with nonpartisan requirements per the constitution; they are prohibited from having a party affiliation) was selected by the Parliament for a term of four-years. In December 1978, incumbent President Benjamin Sheares was appointed president for a third consecutive term. Sheares died in office on 12 May 1981, triggering a parliamentary vote for the next President on 23 October; Devan Nair was voted as Sheares' successor; under the constitution, Nair had to vacate his seat and resign his People's Action Party's membership. Nair had held on Anson since 1979 for two years upon his vacation.

The by-election saw one of the political upsets when Workers' Party Secretary-General J. B. Jeyaretnam won the election with 51.93% of the votes, ending a 14-year PAP's monopoly in Parliament since 1966, and also marked the first time a WP candidate was elected into the legislature since 1961 (WP founder and former Chief Minister of Singapore David Marshall won the 1961 by-election also held in Anson). The 37% swing from 84.10% of votes in 1980 to 47.10% in the by-election also produced the widest swing in any elections to date.

=== 1992 Marine Parade by-election ===
At the time of this by-election, both Deputy Prime Ministers, Ong Teng Cheong and Lee Hsien Loong, were suffering from cancer. Then-Prime Minister Goh Chok Tong decided to hold a by-election in a safe constituency with the best chances of winning for "political self-renewal" to get people of "ministerial calibre" to join the government under PAP, in which their PAP team also introduced Teo Chee Hean into the election, as well as allowing WP Secretary-General J. B. Jeyaretnam to contest after his five-year electoral ban ended two months after the 1991 general election; however, WP did not contest as one candidate turned up late during nomination day. The largest opposition party at the time was Singapore Democratic Party, and SDP fielded a future secretary-general Chee Soon Juan who led his team into the election.

The by-election was the first time where a multi-cornered contest inside a Group Representation Constituency, as both PAP and SDP, alongside the National Solidarity Party and Singapore Justice Party, challenged it; this situation would not occur again until Pasir Ris-Punggol GRC (which also have Teo) saw a three-cornered contest during the 2020 general election. A year after the by-election ended, conflicts between Chee and then-chief Chiam See Tong ensued; Chiam left SDP and later formed Singapore People's Party in 1994, while Chee succeeded Chiam as the SDP's current secretary-general.

As of 2026, it was also the only time a by-election occurred within a GRC; under the current constitution, all the members of parliament within the same constituency needs to be vacated in order for a by-election to be called.

=== 2013 Punggol East by-election ===
On 12 December 2012, then-Speaker of Parliament and incumbent MP for Punggol East SMC, Michael Palmer resigned his speakership and seat due to having an extra-marital affair. The PAP had only won the seat with 54.54%, a margin of 13.53% of the votes over the WP's Lee Li Lian. The subsequent by-election saw WP's Lee Li Lian polling 54.50% over PAP's 43.73%, effecting a swing of 10.81% against the ruling PAP and causing PAP to lose a seat in a by-election for the first time since 1981; Lee also became the first opposition female MP-elect in a SMC.

As of 2026, this by-election was the last time the ruling party failed to retain a constituency in a by-election. The four-way contest inside a constituency (which was last seen in 1997 for Chua Chu Kang SMC and the 2011 Presidential election) was the most recent instance for any contested election until Tampines GRC staged a four-way contest in 2025.

== See also ==
- Elections in Singapore
- Parliamentary elections in Singapore
- Presidential elections in Singapore
