= Remedies in Singapore constitutional law =

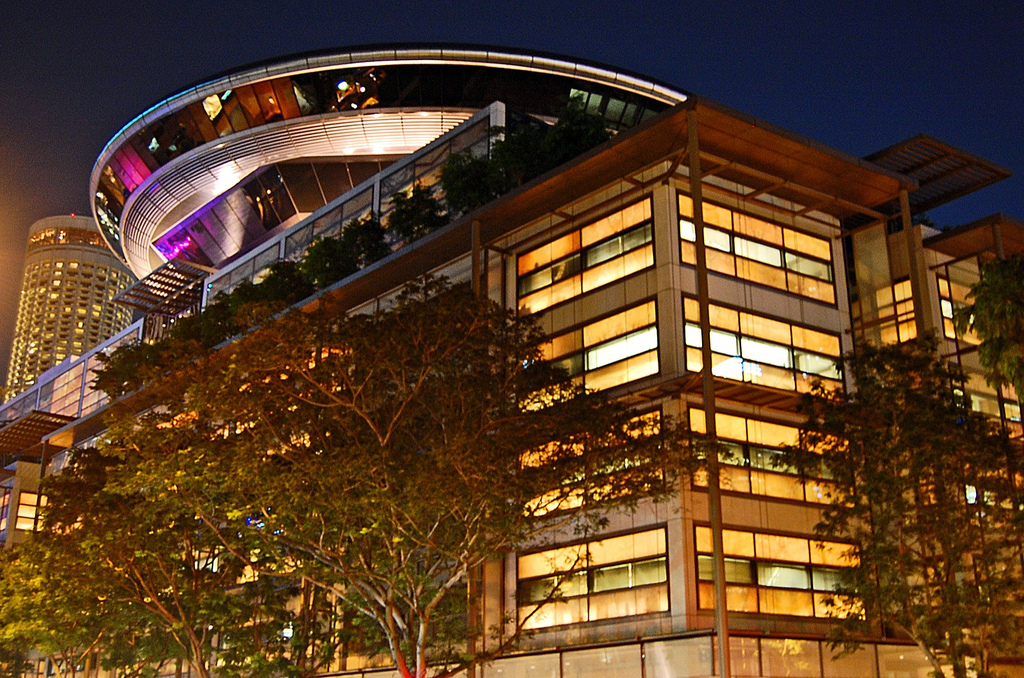
A night view of the Supreme Court of Singapore. Among the remedies that the High Court, which is the lower division of the Supreme Court, can grant for a breach of the Constitution are prerogative orders and declarations.

The remedies available in a Singapore constitutional claim are the prerogative orders – quashing, prohibiting and mandatory orders, and the order for review of detention – and the declaration. As the Constitution of the Republic of Singapore (1985 Rev. Ed., 1999 Reprint) is the supreme law of Singapore, the High Court can hold any law enacted by Parliament, subsidiary legislation issued by a minister, or rules derived from the common law, as well as acts and decisions of public authorities, that are inconsistent with the Constitution to be void. Mandatory orders have the effect of directing authorities to take certain actions, prohibiting orders forbid them from acting, and quashing orders invalidate their acts or decisions. An order for review of detention is sought to direct a party responsible for detaining a person to produce the detainee before the High Court so that the legality of the detention can be established.

The High Court also has the power to grant declarations to strike down unconstitutional legislation. Article 4 of the Constitution states that legislation enacted after the commencement of the Constitution on 9 August 1965 that is inconsistent with the Constitution is void, but the Court of Appeal has held that on a purposive reading of Article 4 even inconsistent legislation enacted before the Constitution's commencement can be invalidated. In addition, Article 162 places a duty on the Court to construe legislation enacted prior to the commencement of the Constitution into conformity with the Constitution.

There are two other more unusual remedies that may be granted. When a law is declared unconstitutional, the Court of Appeal may apply the doctrine of prospective overruling to prevent prejudice to an accused by overruling the law only from the date of the judgment but preserving it with regards to acts done prior to the judgment. In Canada, the Supreme Court has held that unconstitutional laws can be given temporary validity to prevent a legal vacuum caused by the voiding of laws until the legislature has had time to re-enact the laws in a constitutional manner. This remedy has yet to be applied in Singapore.

Damages and injunctions are not remedies that are available in constitutional claims in Singapore.

== Supremacy of the Constitution ==
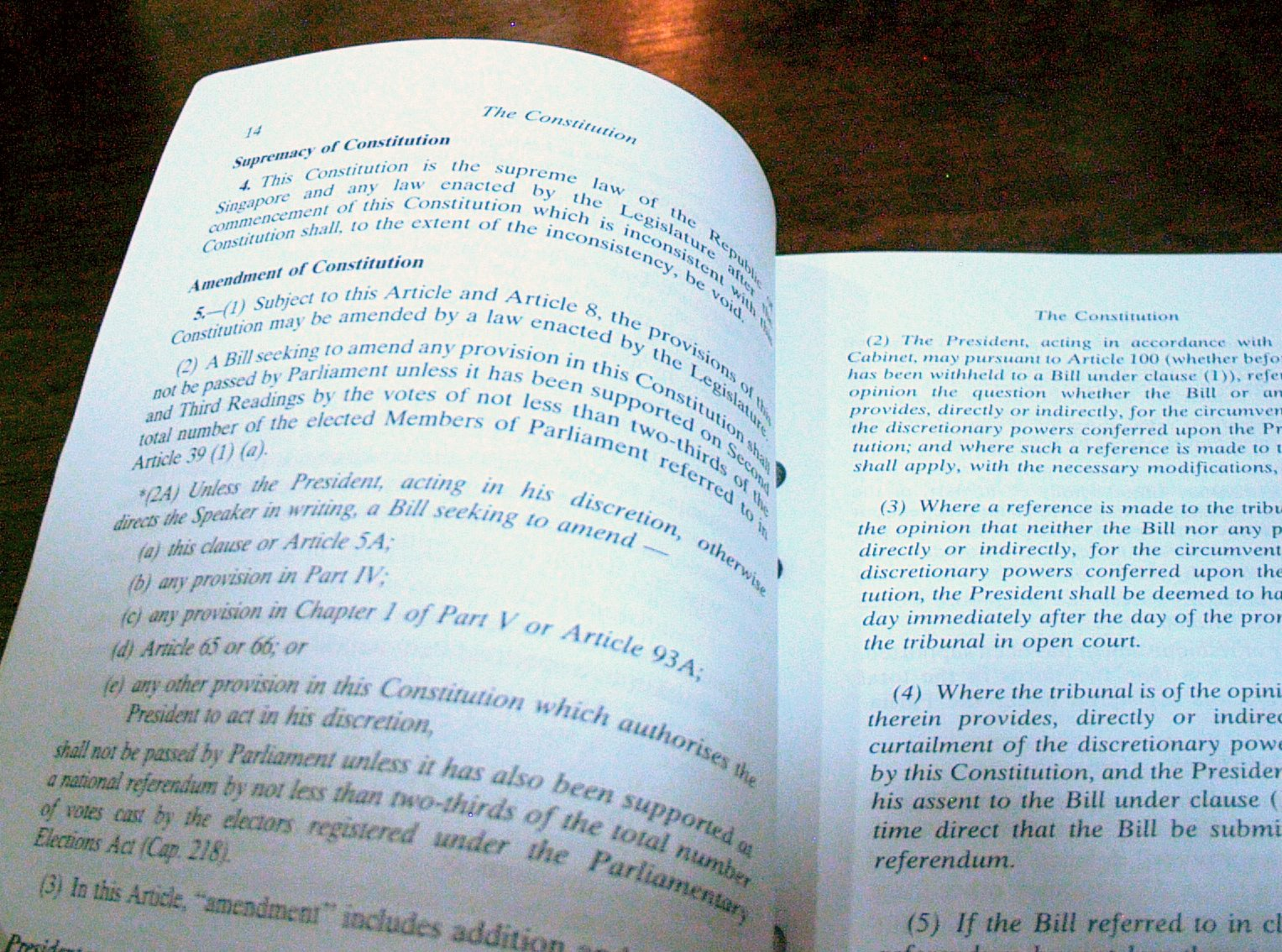
Article 4 appears at the top of the left-hand page in this copy of the Constitution of Singapore (1985 Revised Edition, 1999 Reprint)

The Constitution of the Republic of Singapore is the supreme law of the land. This is supported by Article 4 of the Constitution, which provides:

This Constitution is the supreme law of the Republic of Singapore and any law enacted by the Legislature after the commencement of this Constitution which is inconsistent with this Constitution shall, to the extent of the inconsistency, be void.

The court has the power and duty to uphold the provisions in the Constitution. As the Constitution is supreme, the judiciary can hold any law laid down by Parliament, subsidiary legislation issued by a minister, or rules derived from common law as unconstitutional, and therefore void. The constitutionality of decisions and orders of public authorities can be challenged as well, as the Court of Appeal held in Eng Foong Ho v. Attorney-General (2009).

== Power of the judiciary to grant remedies ==
=== Powers of the High Court ===
In Singapore, the High Court has the power to issue prerogative orders. These include mandatory orders which have the effect of directing public authorities to take certain actions, prohibiting orders that forbid them from acting, and quashing orders that invalidate their acts or decisions. The High Court also has the power to grant declarations to strike down unconstitutional legislation.

=== Powers of the Subordinate Courts ===
The Subordinate Courts have no "jurisdiction relating to the judicial review of any act done or decision made by any person or authority", and do not have the power to grant prerogative orders. Like the High Court, the Subordinate Courts may grant declarations of rights. However, as Magistrate's Courts have no jurisdiction to hear matters that do not involve monetary claims, they cannot declare legislation unconstitutional. On the other hand, it appears that District Courts may be able to do so as no such limitation applies to them, and declaring legislation to be void does not seem to come within the words "judicial review of any act done or decision made by any person or authority".

Previously, under section 56A of the Subordinate Courts Act ("SCA"), when a constitutional question arose in proceedings before the Subordinate Courts, the Courts could refer the question to the High Court and, meanwhile, stay the proceedings. However, this did not mean that the Subordinate Courts could not decide constitutional questions at all. In Johari bin Kanadi v. Public Prosecutor (2008), the High Court held that the Subordinate Courts may decide such questions where the relevant constitutional principles have already been set out by superior courts. Where the principles have not been decided, the question should be referred to the High Court.

==== Current position in relation to criminal matters ====
Section 56A of the SCA was repealed by the Criminal Procedure Code 2010 ("CPC") with effect from 2 January 2011. For criminal cases, sections 395(1) and 395(2)(a) of the CPC have the same effect as the repealed section 56A. Questions of law concerning the Constitution can be referred by a Subordinate Court to the High Court for its decision at any stage of proceedings. In Chee Soon Juan v. Public Prosecutor (2011), which concerned a criminal matter, the High Court held that since the Subordinate Courts lack the power to grant prerogative orders, they do not have jurisdiction to deal with the substantive issues of a constitutional challenge. Such questions should be referred to the High Court unless they are "frivolous, or ... made for collateral purposes or to delay proceedings, or if they otherwise constitute an abuse of process". The Court also cautioned against section 395 being used to circumvent the requirement that leave of court must be obtained to apply for prerogative orders (see below).

It is also possible for a Subordinate Court to state a question of law directly to the Court of Appeal, thus bypassing the High Court. This particular procedure is not restricted to constitutional questions of law.

==== Current position in relation to civil matters ====
For civil matters, the repeal of section 56A means that the Subordinate Courts Act no longer stipulates that constitutional questions must be referred to the High Court. However, this continues to be necessary in Magistrate's Court proceedings because these courts lack jurisdiction to deal with constitutional questions, as mentioned above. Assuming that declarations can be sought from District Courts, decisions that have been made by these courts may be appealed to the High Court and the Court of Appeal in the usual manner. Alternatively, a party apply to the High Court for the constitutional question to be heard in a separate action.

== Challenging a public authority's act or decision as unconstitutional ==
An applicant who alleges that a public authority's act or decision has infringed his or her constitutional rights may bring a judicial review case to the High Court challenging it. It is likely that the remedies sought will be one or more prerogative orders, though the applicant may also ask for a declaration. (Declarations are discussed below.) All remedies are granted at the Court's discretion.

=== Quashing orders ===
The quashing order (formerly known as certiorari) is the most common remedy sought. A quashing order issued by the High Court invalidates a public authority's unconstitutional act or decision. A mandatory order may be linked to the quashing order so as to ensure compliance with the latter. In Chan Hiang Leng Colin v. Ministry of Information and the Arts (1996), the appellants sought leave to apply for a quashing order to invalidate an order banning publications of the International Bible Students Association, a Jehovah's Witnesses organisation, on the ground that it violated their right to freedom of religion protected by Article 15(1) of the Constitution. Leave was denied as the court held that the appellants had failed to establish a prima facie case of reasonable suspicion that the Minister had acted unlawfully or breached the Constitution.

=== Prohibiting orders ===
A prohibiting order (formerly known as a prohibition) prevents an unconstitutional act from being carried out by a public body. Hence, a key difference between a quashing order and a prohibiting order is that the former operates retrospectively while the latter operates prospectively. Where applicants are aware that unconstitutionality can potentially arise, a prohibiting order can be sought to stop the public body from acting unconstitutionally. Such an order will also prevent the same decisions from occurring in the future. In Singapore, there has yet to be any reported case in which an applicant sought a prohibiting order in a constitutional matter. However, in the administrative law context, in Re Fong Thin Choo (1991) the High Court stated that the legal principles which apply to quashing orders are equally applicable to prohibiting orders.

=== Mandatory orders ===
Upon finding that a decision or order of a public authority is unconstitutional, the High Court may grant a mandatory order (formerly known as mandamus) to compel the authority to perform its duties in a manner that is consistent with the Constitution. Although there has yet to be any constitutional case where a mandatory order has been granted, it is likely that the Singapore courts will adopt the same legal principles that apply in administrative law. In the latter, the Court has held that it cannot use a mandatory order to direct how and in what manner a public body should perform its duty. Hence, the Court cannot direct the public body to adopt a particular decision but can only order the body to re-consider its prior decision without lapsing into the unlawfulness that affected it. This is based on the well-settled principle that a reviewing court is limited to determining the legality, and must not deal with the substantive merits, of a decision.

=== Orders for review of detention ===
The unlawful detention of a person is a breach of his or her right to personal liberty guaranteed by Article 9(1) of the Constitution. An order for review of detention (formerly known as habeas corpus) can be sought to direct the party responsible for detaining the person to produce the detainee before the High Court so that the legality of the detention can be established. In Re Onkar Shrian (1969), the High Court held:

[T]he writ [of habeas corpus] is a prerogative process of securing the liberty of the subject by affording an effective means of immediate release from unlawful or unjustifiable detention, whether in prison or in private custody. By it the High Court and the judges of that court, at the instance of a subject aggrieved, command the production of that subject, and inquire into the cause of his imprisonment. If there is no legal justification for the detention, the party is ordered to be released.

The power of the Court to require that this be done is specifically mentioned in Article 9(2) of the Constitution, which states: "Where a complaint is made to the High Court or any Judge thereof that a person is being unlawfully detained, the Court shall inquire into the complaint and, unless satisfied that the detention is lawful, shall order him to be produced before the Court and release him."

In Chng Suan Tze v. Minister for Home Affairs (1988), the appellants had been detained without trial under section 8(1) of the Internal Security Act ("ISA") for alleged involvement in a Marxist conspiracy to subvert and destabilise the country. The detention orders were subsequently suspended under section 10 of the Act, but the suspensions were revoked following the release of a press statement by the appellants in which they denied being Marxist conspirators. Having applied unsuccessfully to the High Court for writs of habeas corpus to be issued, the appellants appealed against the ruling. The Court of Appeal allowed the appeal on the narrow ground that the Government had not adduced sufficient evidence to discharge its burden of proving the President was satisfied that the appellants' detention was necessary to prevent them from endangering, among other things, Singapore's security or public order, which was required by section 8(1) of the ISA before the Minister for Home Affairs could make detention orders against them. However, in a lengthy obiter discussion, the Court held that an objective rather than a subjective test should apply to the exercise of discretion by the authorities under sections 8 and 10 of the ISA. In other words, the exercise of discretion could be reviewed by the court, and the executive had to satisfy the court that there were objective facts justifying its decision.

In the course of its judgment, the Court of Appeal noted that at common law if the return to a writ of habeas corpus – the response to the writ that a person holding a detainee had to give – was valid on its face, the court could not inquire further into the matter. However, section 3 of the UK Habeas Corpus Act 1816 broadened the court's power by entitling it to examine the correctness of the facts mentioned in the return. The section stated, in part:

Judges to inquire into the Truth of Facts contained in Return. Judge to bail on Recognizance to appear in Term, &c. In all cases provided for by this Act, although the return to any writ of habeas corpus shall be good and sufficient in law, it shall be lawful for the justice or baron, before whom such writ may be returnable, to proceed to examine into the truth of the facts set forth in such return by affidavit ...; and to do therein as to justice shall appertain ...

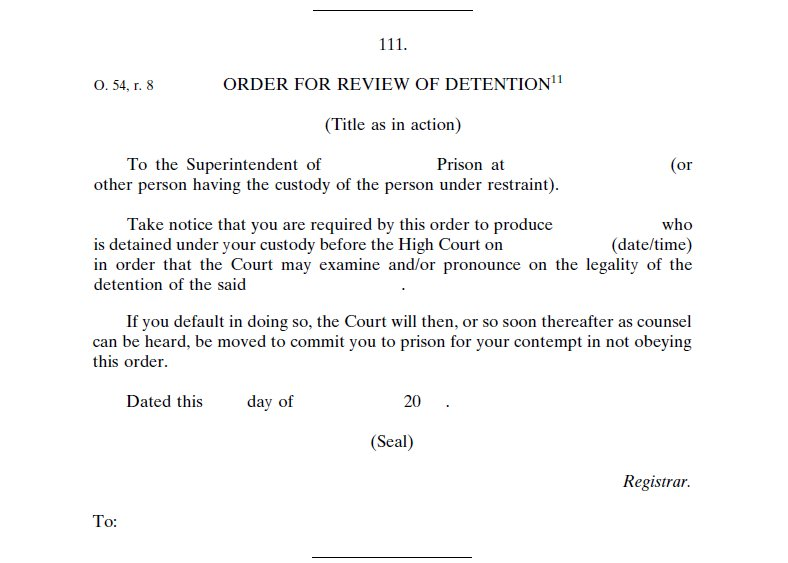
Form 111 of the Rules of Court (Cap. 322, R 5, 2006 Rev. Ed.), the format for an order for review of detention

Section 3 of the Act thus "contemplates the possibility of an investigation by the court so that it may satisfy itself where the truth lies". The extent of the investigation depends on whether a public authority's exercise of the power to detain rests on the existence or absence of certain jurisdictional or precedent facts. If so, the court must assess if the authority has correctly established the existence or otherwise of these facts. However, if the power to detain is not contingent on precedent facts, the court's task is only to determine whether there exists evidence upon which the authority could reasonably have acted.

The UK Habeas Corpus Act 1816 applied to Singapore by virtue of the Second Charter of Justice 1826, which is generally accepted to have made all English statutes and principles of English common law and equity in force as at 27 November 1826 applicable in the Straits Settlements (including Singapore), unless they were unsuitable to local conditions and could not be modified to avoid causing injustice or oppression. In 1994, after Chng Suan Sze was decided, the Application of English Law Act was enacted with the effect that only English statutes specified in the First Schedule of the Act continued to apply in Singapore after 12 November 1993. The Habeas Corpus Act 1816 is not one of these statutes, and so appears to have ceased to be part of Singapore law. Nonetheless, it may be argued that High Court should continue to apply a rule equivalent to section 3 of the Act to orders for review of detention because of Article 9(2) of the Constitution, which should not be regarded as having been abridged unless the legislature has used clear and unequivocal language. In addition, in Eshugbayi Eleko v. Government of Nigeria (1931), Lord Atkin said:

In accordance with British jurisprudence no member of the executive can interfere with the liberty or property of a British subject except on the condition that he can support the legality of his action before a court of justice. And it is the tradition of British justice that judges should not shrink from deciding such issues in the face of the executive.

Since an order for review of detention is a remedy for establishing the legality of detention, it may not be used to challenge the conditions under which a person is held, if the detention itself is lawful. Moreover, an order can only be sought where a person is being physically detained, and not if he or she is merely under some other form of restriction such as being out on bail.

Both nationals and non-nationals of a jurisdiction may apply for orders for review of detention. In the UK context, Lord Scarman disagreed with the suggestion that habeas corpus protection only extends to British nationals, stating in Khera v. Secretary of State for the Home Department; Khawaja v. Secretary of State for the Home Department ("Khawaja", 1983), that "[e]very person within the jurisdiction enjoys the equal protection of our laws. There is no distinction between British nationals and others. He who is subject to English law is entitled to its protection."

=== Procedure for seeking prerogative orders ===
==== Quashing, prohibiting and mandatory orders ====
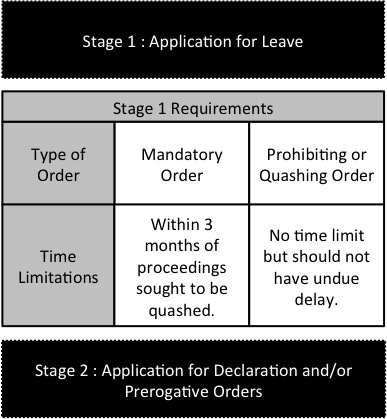
The two-stage procedure under O. 53 of the Rules of Court

The procedure for bringing applications for prerogative orders is set out in Order 53 of the Rules of Court ("O. 53"). It is a two-stage process. At the first stage, the applicant must request the High Court for leave to apply for one or more prerogative orders. An application for such leave must be made by ex parte originating summons and must be supported by a statement setting out the name and description of the applicant, the relief sought and the grounds on which it is sought; and by an affidavit verifying the facts relied on.

The test for whether leave should be granted is expressed in Public Service Commission v. Lai Swee Lin Linda (2001). The court is "not to embark upon any detailed and microscopic analysis of the material placed before it but ... to peruse the material before it quickly and appraise whether such material disclose[s] an arguable and a prima facie case of reasonable suspicion" that a public authority acted unlawfully.

Leave for a quashing order must generally be applied for within three months of the act or decision that is sought to be quashed. However, an application for leave can still be allowed if the applicant can account for the delay to the satisfaction of the court. There is no specified time limit within which leave to apply for a mandatory order or prohibiting order must be sought. However, the High Court has held that such an application should be made without undue delay.

Should leave be granted, the applicant can proceed to the second stage which is the actual application for one or more of the prerogative orders.

Before O. 53 was amended in 2011, the High Court did not have jurisdiction to grant a declaration under O. 53 proceedings, as a declaration is not a prerogative order. If an applicant wished to obtain both prerogative orders and declarations, a separate action had to be commenced for the declarations. After the amendment, it is now possible to include a claim for a declaration if leave has been granted to the applicant to apply for prerogative orders.

==== Orders for review of detention ====
The procedure for applying for an order for review of detention differs from that for obtaining a mandatory order, prohibiting order or quashing order because the latter orders are only available by leave of court, whereas an order for review of detention is issued as of right. The procedure for doing so is set out in Order 54 of the Rules of Court. An application must be made to the High Court by way of an ex parte originating summons, supported, if possible, by an affidavit from the person being restrained which shows that the application is being made at his or her instance and explaining the nature of the restraint. If the person under restraint is unable to personally make an affidavit, someone may do so on his or her behalf, explaining the reason for the inability.

Upon the filing of the application, the Court may either make an order immediately, or direct that a summons for the order for review of detention be issued to enable all the parties involved to present arguments to the Court. If the latter course is taken, the ex parte originating summons, supporting affidavit, order of court and summons must be served on the person against whom the order is sought. Unless the Court directs otherwise, it is not necessary for the person under restraint to be brought before the Court for the hearing of the application. In addition, the Court may order that the person be released while the application is being heard. Once the Court decides to make an order for review of detention, it will direct when the person under restraint is to be brought before the court.

The applicant has the initial burden of showing that he or she has a prima facie case that should be considered by the Court. Once this has been done, it is for the executive to justify the legality of the detention. One commentator has said that the applicant's task is to discharge his or her evidential burden, following which the public authority detaining the applicant has a legal burden of showing that the detention is lawful. The standard of proof required to be achieved by the authority is the civil standard of a balance of probabilities, but "flexibly applied" in the sense that the degree of probability must be appropriate to what is at stake. Thus, in Khawaja Lord Bridge of Harwich said that given the seriousness of the allegations against a detainee and the consequences of the detention, "the court should not be satisfied with anything less than probability of a high degree".

== Challenging unconstitutional legislation ==
As mentioned above, an aggrieved party who alleges that legislation enacted by Parliament violates his or her constitutional rights may apply for a declaration from the High Court that the legislation is unconstitutional.

=== Effect of Articles 4 and 162 of the Constitution ===
==== Article 4 ====
Article 4 of the Constitution affirms that it is the supreme law of Singapore and that "any law enacted by the Legislature after the commencement of this Constitution which is inconsistent with this Constitution shall, to the extent of the inconsistency, be void". The date of the Constitution's commencement is defined as 9 August 1965, the date of Singapore's independence.

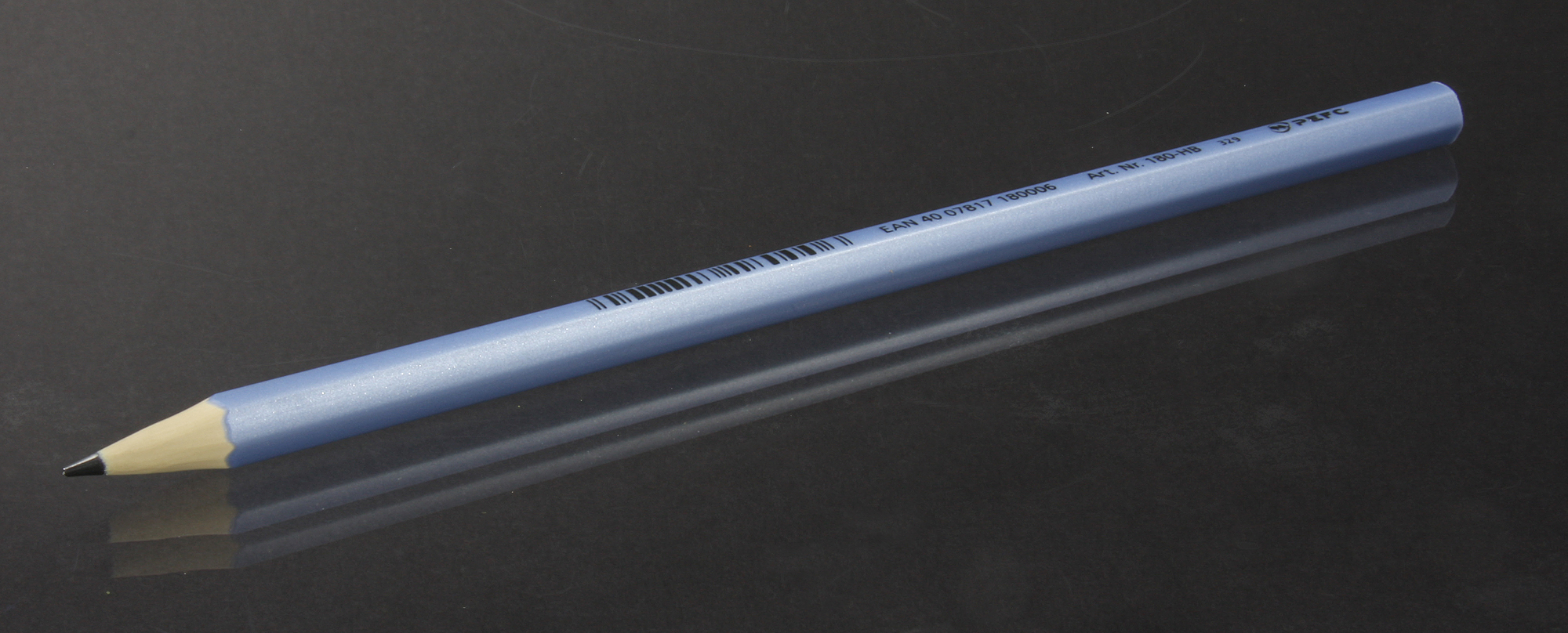
It is not yet clear whether the Singapore courts will apply the UK "blue pencil" test when deciding if legislation is constitutional

Article 4 implies that the High Court may void a piece of legislation to the extent of its inconsistency with the Constitution. At present, it is unclear how the Court will apply this requirement. If, say, an entire piece of criminal legislation or one of its provisions is found to be void, a person alleged to have committed an offence created by the impugned legislation may be able to escape liability. To circumvent this, a test of severability, also known as the "blue pencil" test, has been established in the UK. If the unconstitutional parts of the legislation are severable from the constitutional parts, the latter are preserved and remain valid and enforceable. In Director of Public Prosecutions v. Hutchinson (1988), the House of Lords held that two forms of severability must be established for a law to be held partially valid – textual severability and substantial severability. A provision is textually severable if it remains grammatical and correct after severance. It is substantially severable if its substance after severance remains true to its "legislative purpose, operation and effect". However, the court also recognised that a rigid adherence to the test of textual severability may result in unreasonable consequences. It may defeat legislation with a substantial purpose clearly within the lawmaker's power but, by oversight, which was written in a way that exceeded that scope of power. Hence, the "blue pencil" test may still apply to rescue a provision that is not textually severable as long as it does not alter the substantial purpose and effect of the impugned provision.

==== Article 162 ====
Article 162 of the Constitution provides as follows:

Subject to this Article, all existing laws shall continue in force on and after the commencement of this Constitution and all laws which have not been brought into force by the date of the commencement of this Constitution may, subject as aforesaid, be brought into force on or after its commencement, but all such laws shall, subject to this Article, be construed as from the commencement of this Constitution with such modifications, adaptations, qualifications and exceptions as may be necessary to bring them into conformity with this Constitution. [Emphasis added.]

In Ghaidan v. Godin-Mendoza (2004), the House of Lords recognised that when a former colonial territory of the UK has a written constitution that empowers its courts to construe legislation "with such modifications, adaptations, qualifications and exceptions as may be necessary to bring them into conformity with the constitution", the courts exercise a quasi-legislative power. This means that the courts are not only confined to interpreting the legislation, but may also exercise a power to modify and amend it to bring it into conformity with the Constitution. Their Lordships noted that in R. v. Hughes (2002) the Privy Council had exercised a legislative power to delete express words in the impugned statute. Such an act is appropriate in a legal system where there is constitutional supremacy, and "[a] finding of inconsistency may leave a lacuna in the statute book which in many cases must be filled without delay if chaos is to be avoided and which can be filled only by the exercise of a legislative power".

===== Applicability to laws in force prior to commencement of Constitution =====
In Review Publishing Co. Ltd. v. Lee Hsien Loong (2010), the Court of Appeal rejected the appellant's claim that Article 105(1) of the Constitution of the State of Singapore 1963 (now Article 162) entailed that all existing laws should be adjusted to the Constitution. Instead, the Court held that the Article had the effect of re-enacting all existing laws at the date of commencement of the Constitution. Thus, in essence, such existing laws remain in force after the Constitution's commencement as they amount to laws imposed by Parliament as a restriction on fundamental liberties such as the right to freedom of speech and expression guaranteed to citizens by Article 14(1)(a). Article 14(2)(a) states:

Parliament may by law impose – ... on the rights conferred by clause (1)(a), such restrictions as it considers necessary or expedient in the interest of the security of Singapore or any part thereof, friendly relations with other countries, public order or morality and restrictions designed to protect the privileges of Parliament or to provide against contempt of court, defamation or incitement to any offence ...

It appears that the Court of Appeal only applied the first limb of Article 162 ("all existing laws shall continue in force on and after the coming into operation of this Constitution"), and did not take into account the second limb ("all such laws shall ... be construed as from the commencement of this Constitution with such modifications, adaptations, qualifications and exceptions as may be necessary to bring them into conformity with this Constitution"). In contrast, the Privy Council in Director of Public Prosecutions v. Mollison (No. 2) (2003) held that section 4 of the Jamaica (Constitution) Order in Council 1962, which is similarly worded to Article 162, does not protect existing laws from constitutional challenge but "recognises that existing laws may be susceptible to constitutional challenge and accordingly confers power on the courts and the Governor General (among others) to modify and adapt existing laws so as 'to bring them into conformity with the provisions of this Order'".

In any case, the Court of Appeal appears to have departed from the approach it adopted in Review Publishing. In Tan Eng Hong v. Attorney-General (2012), it took the view that while the court does not have power under Article 162 to hold that laws inconsistent with the Constitution are entirely void, a purposive reading of Articles 4 and 162 indicates that pre-commencement laws can be declared void under Article 4, even though that Article only refers specifically to laws enacted after the Constitution's commencement.

=== Declarations ===
If an applicant wishes to contend that a public body's act or decision is inconsistent with the Constitution, the remedy requested is essentially a declaration, which has the effect of stating the law based on the facts before the court and establishes the legal position between the parties to the action.

A declaration was sought in Chee Siok Chin v. Attorney-General (2006), where the plaintiffs claimed that the repeal of O. 14, r. 1(2) of the Rules of the Supreme Court 1970 by way of the Rules of the Supreme Court (Amendment No. 2) Rules 1991 ("the 1991 amendment") was unconstitutional and in breach of the principles of natural justice. However, the assertion was held to be groundless as counsel for the plaintiffs had failed to identify exactly which part of the Constitution had been violated by the 1991 amendment and explain how the plaintiffs' constitutional rights had been abrogated. As such, no declaratory order was granted to render the amended O. 14 summary judgment procedure unconstitutional.

=== Prospective overruling ===
Statutes and common law rules that are declared unconstitutional are void ab initio (from the beginning) – it is as if they never existed. This may create a problem as past cases decided on the basis of the unconstitutional legislation or precedent may be open to re-litigation. To overcome this problem, the Court of Appeal may apply the doctrine of prospective overruling to preserve the state of law prior to the date when the unconstitutional law is overruled.

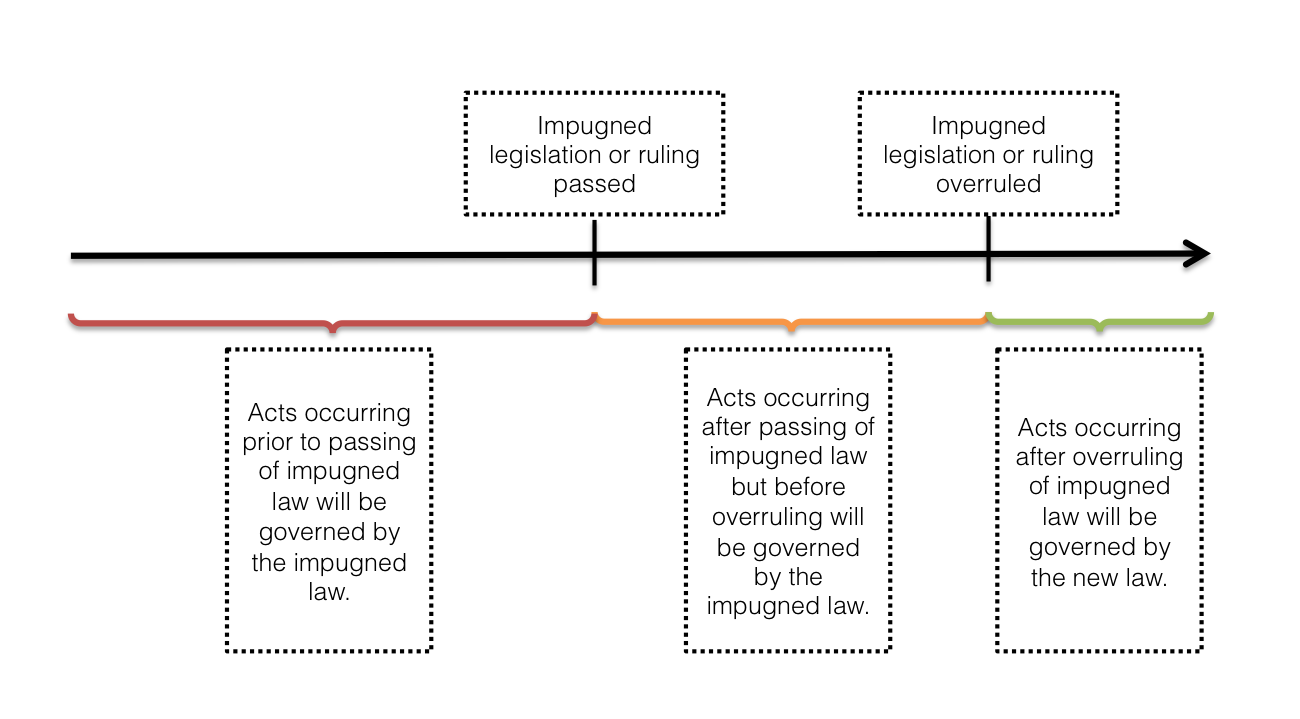
A diagram illustrating how the doctrine of prospective overruling works

The principle was set out by the Court of Appeal in Public Prosecutor v. Manogaran s/o R. Ramu (1996) as follows:

[I]f a person organises his affairs in accordance with an existing judicial pronouncement about the state of the law, his actions should not be impugned retrospectively by a subsequent judicial pronouncement which changes the state of the law, without his having been afforded an opportunity to reorganise his affairs.

Manogaran was a criminal rather than a constitutional matter. The Court overruled an earlier decision, Abdul Raman bin Yusof v. Public Prosecutor (1996), holding that the decision had incorrectly defined the term cannabis mixture in the Misuse of Drugs Act. However, it held that the overruling should apply prospectively – in other words, the new definition of cannabis mixture should only apply to acts occurring after the date of the judgment, and the accused was entitled to rely on the law as stated in Abdul Raman. In reaching this decision, the Court relied on the principle of nullem crimen nulla poena sine lege ("conduct cannot be punished as criminal unless some rule of law has already declared conduct of that kind to be criminal and punishable as such"), which it said was embodied in Article 11(1) of the Constitution:

No person shall be punished for an act or omission which was not punishable by law when it was done or made, and no person shall suffer greater punishment for an offence than was prescribed by law at the time it was committed.

Prospective overruling is a remedy available in constitutional cases, as in Manogaran the Court noted that the doctrine had been developed in US jurisprudence to deal with the consequences of laws being declared unconstitutional. It cited the United States Supreme Court decision Chicot County Drainage District v. Baxter State Bank (1940):

The actual existence of a statute, prior to such a determination, is an operative fact and may have consequences which cannot justly be ignored. The past cannot always be erased by a new judicial declaration. ... [I]t is manifest from numerous decisions that an all-inclusive statement of a principle of absolute retroactive invalidity cannot be justified.

One limit to the doctrine's application is that it can only be applied by the Court of Appeal.

The doctrine of prospective overruling was also applied in the case of Abdul Nasir bin Amer Hamsah v. Public Prosecutor (1997). The Court of Appeal clarified that the sentence of life imprisonment did not mean imprisonment for 20 years as had been the understanding for some time, but rather imprisonment for the whole of the remaining period of a convicted person's natural life. However, if the judgment applied retrospectively, this would be unjust to accused persons already sentenced to life imprisonment as they would have been assured by lawyers and the Singapore Prison Service that they would only be incarcerated up to 20 years. Some accused persons might even have pleaded guilty on that understanding. Thus, the Court held that its re-interpretation of the law would not apply to convictions and offences committed prior to the date of the judgment.

=== Temporary validation of unconstitutional laws ===
Another remedy that Singapore courts might apply if an appropriate case arises – though it has yet to do so – is the granting of temporary validity to unconstitutional laws. When a piece of legislation is ruled as unconstitutional, a lacuna or gap in the law may ensue as the legislation is void retrospectively and prospectively. The situation is exacerbated if the legislation is one with far-reaching effects. Hence, to overcome the negative impact of such a lacuna, the Supreme Court of Canada has adopted the remedy of granting temporary validity to unconstitutional legislation for the minimum time necessary for the legislature to enact alternative laws.

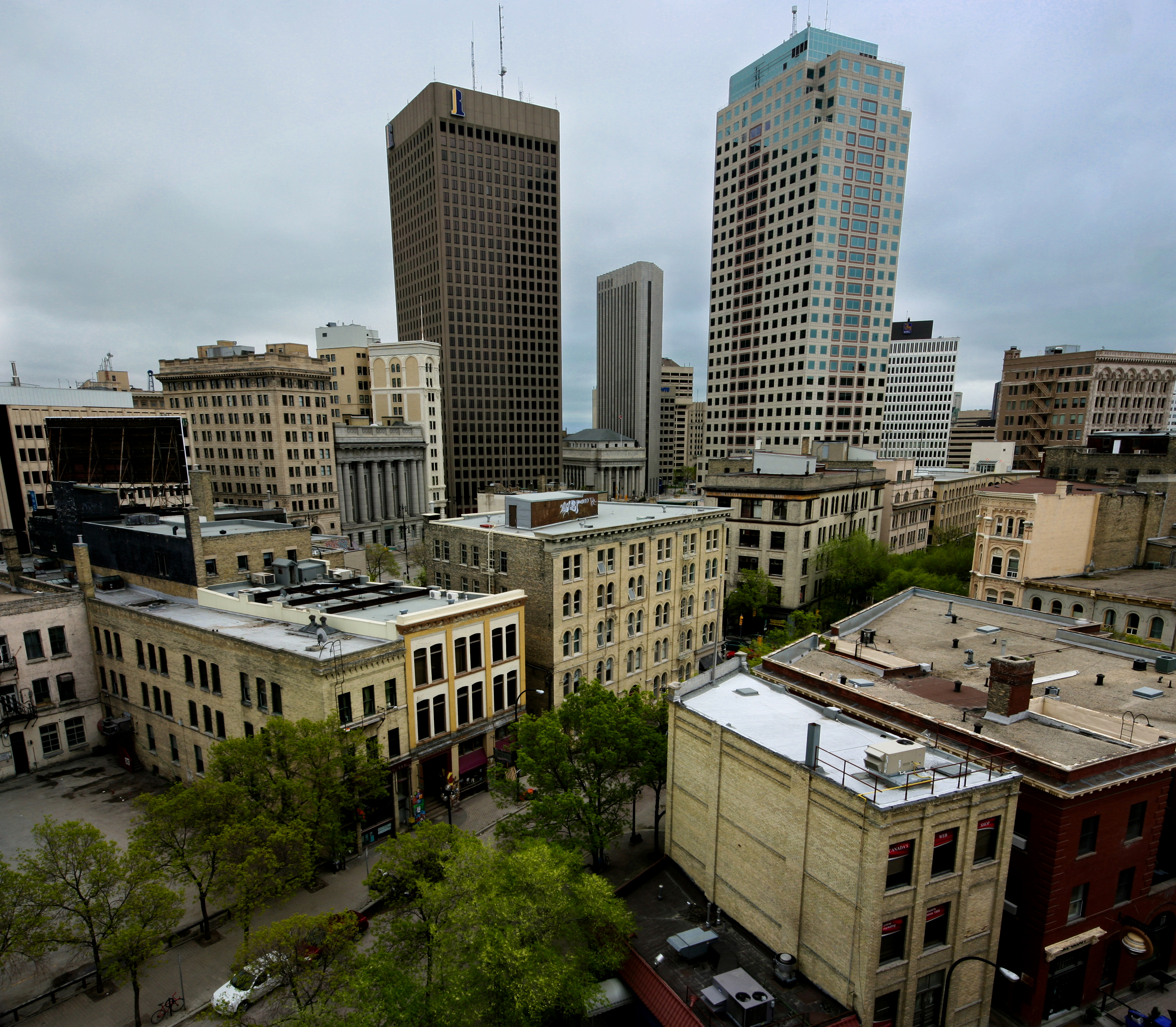
The Exchange District in downtown Winnipeg, the capital of Manitoba. In Reference re Manitoba Language Rights (1985), the Supreme Court of Canada granted the novel remedy of giving temporary validity to unconstitutional laws.

In the case of Reference re Manitoba Language Rights (1985), the Official Language Act, 1890 purported to allow Acts of the Legislature of Manitoba to be published and printed only in English. The Supreme Court held that the Official Language Act was unconstitutional 95 years after it was passed, as it was inconsistent with section 23 of the Manitoba Act, 1870 (part of the Constitution of Canada) which requires Acts to be published in both English and French. The impact of such an outcome was that all laws of Manitoba which had not enacted in both English and French were never valid. These laws included, among others, laws governing persons' rights, criminal law, and even the laws pertaining to election of the Legislature.

The remedy of temporary validation of unconstitutional laws was granted because the Supreme Court noted that if statutes enacted solely in English after the Manitoba Act were simply held void without more, the resulting absence of applicable laws would breach the rule of law. The Court also found support in the doctrine of state necessity, under which statutes that are unconstitutional can be treated as valid during a public emergency. It referred to the case of Attorney-General of the Republic v. Mustafa Ibrahim (1964), in which the Cyprus Court of Appeal held that four prerequisites are required before the state necessity doctrine can be invoked to validate an unconstitutional law: "(a) an imperative and inevitable necessity or exceptional circumstances; (b) no other remedy to apply; (c) the measure taken must be proportionate to the necessity; and (d) it must be of a temporary character limited to the duration of the exceptional circumstances".

== Remedies unavailable in constitutional law ==
=== Damages ===
The constitutions of some jurisdictions have clauses stating that the court may provide redress to those whose rights have been shown to be violated. The Privy Council has held that such clauses empower the court to grant damages (monetary compensation) vindicating the constitutional right that has been contravened to "reflect the sense of public outrage, emphasise the importance of the constitutional right and the gravity of the breach, and deter further breaches". However, no clause of this nature exists in the Singapore Constitution. Since in Singapore the granting of damages is outside the ambit of judicial review in administrative law, the same is probably true for a breach of the Constitution. In order to claim damages, an aggrieved person must be able to establish a private law claim in contract or tort law. Prior to May 2011, if prerogative orders had been applied for under O. 53 of the Rules of Court, such a person would have had to take out a separate legal action for damages. Now, it is possible for a person who has successfully obtained prerogative orders or a declaration to ask the High Court to also award him or her "relevant relief", that is, a liquidated sum, damages, equitable relief or restitution. The Court may give directions to the parties relating to the conduct of the proceedings or otherwise to determine whether the applicant is entitled to the relevant relief sought, and must allow any party opposing the granting of such relief an opportunity to be heard.

If a claimant establishes that a public authority's wrongful action amounts to a tort, he or she may be able to obtain exemplary damages if it can be shown that the authority has been guilty of "oppressive, arbitrary or unconstitutional action" in the exercise of a public function.

=== Injunctions ===
An injunction is a remedy having the effect of preventing the party to whom it is addressed from executing certain ultra vires acts. An injunction that is positive in nature may also be granted to compel performance of a particular act. This remedy is not available in Singapore in relation to public law. The Government Proceedings Act prevents the court from imposing injunctions or ordering specific performance in any proceedings against the Government. However, in place of such relief, the court may make an order declaratory of the rights between parties.

== See also ==
- Constitution of Singapore
- Declaration (law)
- Prerogative writ
