= General elections in Singapore =

Elections to the Parliament of Singapore

General elections in Singapore

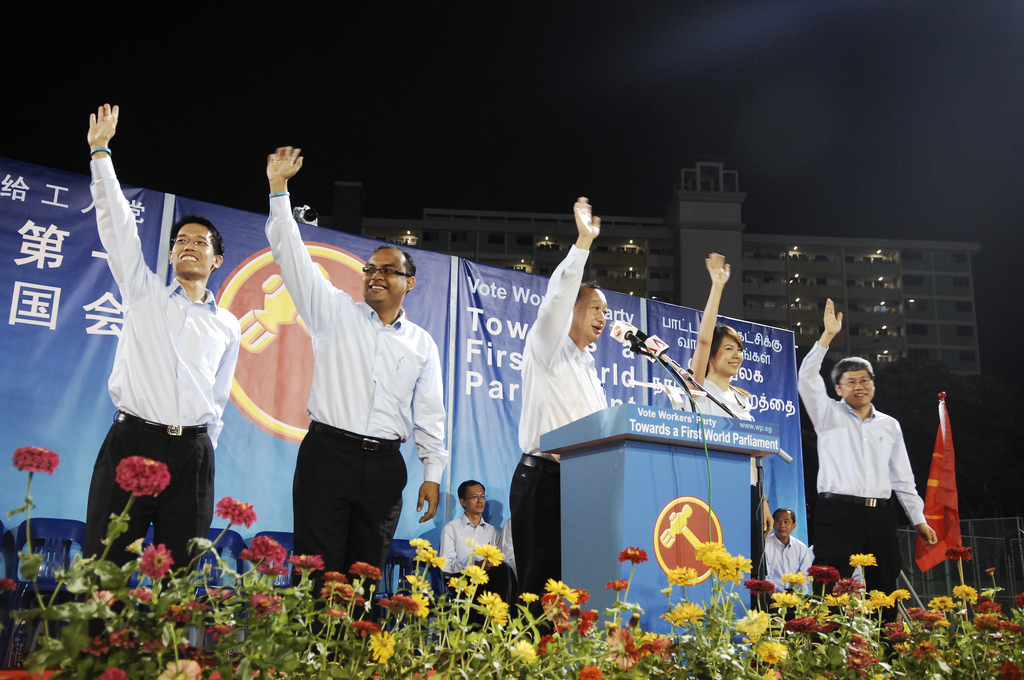
Workers' Party members at a election rally in Bedok during the 2011 general election

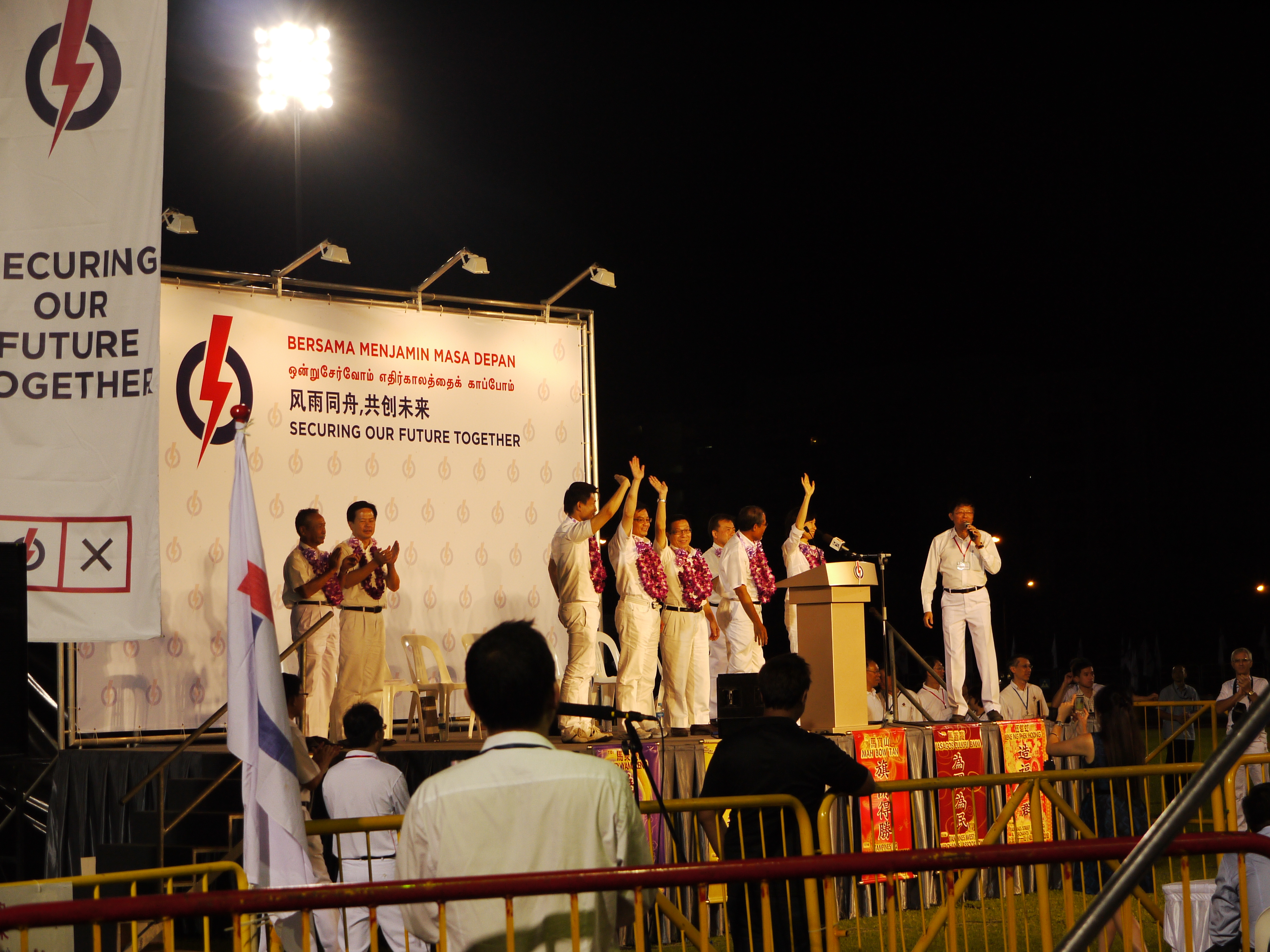
People's Action Party members at a rally in Tampines during the 2011 general election

General elections in Singapore must be held within three months after five years have elapsed from the date of the first sitting of a particular Parliament of Singapore, as per the Constitution. However, Parliament can also be dissolved and a general election called at the behest of the Prime Minister before the five-year period elapses. The number of constituencies or electoral divisions is not permanently fixed by law, but is declared by the prime minister prior to each general election pursuant to the Parliamentary Elections Act (Cap. 218, 2011 Rev. Ed.), which governs the conduct of elections to Parliament, taking into account recommendations of the Electoral Boundaries Review Committee.

In Singapore, the Parliament is unicameral. For the 2025 general election, there are 97 elected seats in Parliament organised into 15 Single Member Constituencies (SMCs) and 18 Group Representation Constituencies (GRCs). Each SMC returns one Member of Parliament (MP) while each GRC returns between three and six MPs, at least one of whom must be from the Malay, Indian or other minority communities. A group of persons wishing to stand for election in a GRC must all be members of the same political party, or a group of independent candidates. The voting age in Singapore is 21.

The most recent election was last held on 3 May 2025, with the People's Action Party (PAP) winning 87 out of the 97 seats (Note: Five of which were elected unopposed.) with 65.57% of the popular vote, while the incumbent opposition party, the Workers' Party (WP), won the remaining 10 seats.

== Electoral process ==
The election process begins when the President, acting on Cabinet's advice, issues a writ of election addressed to the returning officer. On nomination day, the returning officer and their representatives will be present at designated nomination centres between 11:00 am and 12:00 noon to receive prospective candidates' nomination papers, and political donation certificates certifying that they have complied with the requirements of the Political Donations Act (Cap. 236, 2001 Rev. Ed.). A person intending to contest in a GRC as a minority candidate must also submit a certificate confirming that they are a person belonging to the Malay, Indian or some other minority community. In addition, between the date of the writ of election and 12:00 noon on nomination day, candidates must lodge with the returning officer a deposit equal to 8% of the total allowances payable to an MP in the preceding calendar year, rounded to the nearest $500, which varies in each election. At the close of the nomination period, if there are multiple candidates in an SMC or more than one group of candidates in a GRC, the election is adjourned for a poll to be taken, otherwise, the election is declared walkover and that the only one candidate in an SMC or the sole group of candidates in a GRC being MP-elects. The returning officer issues a notice of contested election which states when polling day will be; and information such as the names of the candidates, their proposers and seconders, the symbols allocated to candidates, and their passport photos, all of which will be printed on ballot papers, and the locations of polling stations.

Candidates can only mount election campaigns from after the close of nomination up to the day before the eve of polling day. No campaigning is permitted on the eve of polling day itself, which is known as "cooling-off day". Candidates can advertise on the Internet, conduct house-to-house visits, distribute pamphlets, put up banners and posters, and hold election rallies. Political parties fielding at least six candidates are allocated airtime for two pre-recorded party political broadcasts on radio and television, one on the day following nomination day and the other on cooling-off day. The amount of airtime granted depends on the number of candidates each party is fielding. The maximum amount which a candidate or their election agent can pay or incur for an election campaign is currently $5 per the electorate in an SMC, or in the case of GRC, the average electorate per the size of the GRC itself.

Polling day at a general election is a public holiday, and voting is compulsory. Unless the returning officer decides otherwise, polling stations are open from 8:00 am to 8:00 pm. Voters must go to the polling stations assigned to them. In 2023, the Elections Department introduced a postal voting trial for overseas Singaporeans to cast their votes at overseas missions and government offices. Since 2018, electronic registration has been used to register voters at polling stations. This makes the registration process faster than the previous practice of manually checking and striking off the names against a hardcopy register. After the poll closes, the presiding officer of each polling station seals the ballot box without opening them. Candidates or their polling agents may also affix their own seals to the ballot boxes. The ballot boxes are then taken to counting centres to be opened and the ballots counted. Since 2018, vote counting is conducted by counting machines similar to those used to handle bank notes. This makes the counting process three times faster than the previous practice of manually counting the ballot papers by counting assistants. To curb speculation from unofficial sources, a sample count is typically performed at the start of the counting process to get an indication of the possible electoral outcome. This is based on a random bundle of 100 ballot papers from each polling station in the contested electoral division. A candidate or his counting agent may ask the returning officer for a recount of votes if the difference between the number of votes for the candidate or group of candidates with the most votes and the number of votes of any other candidate or group of candidate is 2% or less, excluding rejected and tendered votes. After all counts, and recounts if any, have been completed, the returning officer ascertains whether the total number of electors registered to vote overseas is less than the difference between the number of votes for the two candidates with the highest number of votes. If so, the returning officer declares the candidate with the highest number of votes to be elected for the electoral division. If not, the returning officer states the number of votes cast for each candidate and the date and location where the overseas votes will be counted.

== Composition and term of Parliament ==
The Parliament of Singapore is unicameral and consists of three types of Members of Parliament: elected Members of Parliament (MPs), Non-constituency Members of Parliament (NCMPs), and Nominated Members of Parliament (NMPs). Of these, MPs are chosen by universal suffrage or popular election under a first-past-the-post and party block voting system, while NCMPs are chosen from among the candidates of political parties not forming the Government.

Demarcation of the boundaries of the various constituencies in the 2025 general election (click on the image for a larger version)

The maximum duration of each Parliament is five years from the date of its first sitting. If Parliament has not been dissolved before that period has elapsed, it is automatically dissolved by operation of law. However, in most cases Parliament is dissolved and a general election called at the behest of the Prime Minister, who is entitled to advise the President to do so by a proclamation published in the Government Gazette. The president is not obliged to proclaim that Parliament is dissolved unless he is satisfied that the prime minister commands the confidence of a majority of MPs. Once Parliament has been dissolved, a general election must be held within three months.

The number of elected MPs and constituencies or electoral divisions is not permanently fixed by law, but is declared by the prime minister prior to each general election pursuant to the Parliamentary Elections Act, which governs the conduct of elections to Parliament, taking into account recommendations of the Electoral Boundaries Review Committee. Each constituency may be of Single Member Constituency (SMC) or Group Representation Constituency (GRC). Each SMC returns one MP while each GRC returns between three and six MPs, at least one of whom must be from the Malay, Indian or other minority communities. A group of persons wishing to stand for election in a GRC must all be members of the same political party, or a group of independent candidates.

For the purposes of the 2025 general election, there were 97 electable seats in Parliament organised into 15 SMCs and 18 GRCs. (Note: The 2025 revision of the Group Representation Constituencies allocated 11 GRCs (six four-member and five five-member GRCs) as designated wards for which at least one member of the Malay community had to be fielded as a candidate, and seven GRCs (two four-member and five five-member GRCs) as designates for which at least one member of the Indian or some other minority community had to be fielded.)

=== Qualifications for Parliamentary candidates ===
Persons are qualified to be elected or appointed as MPs if:

- they are Singapore citizens;
- they are 21 years of age or above on the day of nomination for election;
- their names appear in a current register of electors;
- they are resident in Singapore at the date of nomination and have been so resident for an aggregate period of not less than ten years before that date;
- they are able, with a degree of proficiency sufficient to enable them to take an active part in Parliamentary proceedings, to speak and, unless incapacitated by blindness or some other physical cause, to read and write at least one of the following languages: English, Malay, Mandarin and Tamil; and
- they are not otherwise disqualified from being MPs under Article 45 of the Constitution

Article 45 provides that persons are not qualified to be MPs if:

- they are and have been found or declared to be of unsound mind;
- they are undischarged bankrupts;
- they hold offices of profit;
- having been nominated for election to Parliament or the office of president or having acted as election agent to a person so nominated, they have failed to lodge any return of election expenses required by law within the time and in the manner required;
- they have been convicted of an offence by a court of law in Singapore or Malaysia and sentenced to imprisonment for a term of not less than one year or to a fine of not less than S$10,000 (Note: The amount was S$2,000 prior to the amendment in May 2022.) and have not received a free pardon;
- they have voluntarily acquired the citizenship of, or exercised rights of citizenship in, a foreign country or has made a declaration of allegiance to a foreign country; or
- they are disqualified under any law relating to offences in connection with elections to Parliament or the office of president by reason of having been convicted of such an offence or having in proceedings relating to such an election been proved guilty of an act constituting such an offence.

A person's disqualification for having failed to properly lodge a return of election expenses or having been convicted of an offence may be removed by the president. If the president has not done so, the disqualification ceases at the end of five years from the date on which the return was required to be lodged or, as the case may be, the date on which the person convicted was released from custody or the date on which the fine was imposed. In addition, a person is not disqualified for acquiring or exercising rights of foreign citizenship or declared allegiance to a foreign country if they did so before becoming a Singapore citizen.

== Electors ==
To be eligible to vote in a general election in a particular year, a person's name must appear in a certified register of electors of that year. A register of electors is prepared for each electoral division in Singapore. A person is entitled to have their name entered or retained in an electoral register of a certain year if on 1 January of that year they are a Singapore citizen who is ordinarily resident in Singapore, not less than 21 years old, and not subject to any disqualifications. A person not resident in Singapore but entitled to have their name entered or retained in a register of electors for a particular electoral division may apply to be registered as an overseas elector any time before a writ of election is issued for any election in that division.

A person is disqualified from having their name entered or retained in a register of electors if they:

- have done any of the following:
  - acquired or applied to acquire the citizenship of a country outside Singapore by registration, naturalisation or other voluntary and formal act other than marriage;
  - voluntarily claimed and exercised rights available under the law of a country outside Singapore which are enjoyed exclusively by citizens or nationals of that country, except the use of a foreign passport;
  - taken any oath or made any declaration or acknowledgment of allegiance, obedience or adherence to any foreign power or state; or
  - applied to the authorities of a place outside Singapore for the issue or renewal of a passport or used a passport issued by such authorities as a travel document;
- is serving a sentence of imprisonment imposed by any court in or outside Singapore for an offence punishable with imprisonment of more than 12 months; or has been sentenced to death by such a court or is serving a term of imprisonment in lieu of a death sentence;
- is found or declared to be of unsound mind under any written law;
- has been convicted of a corrupt or illegal practice under the PEA or the Presidential Elections Act, or an election judge reports that they have committed a corrupt or illegal practice;
- is a serving member on full pay of any naval, military or air force not maintained out of moneys provided by Parliament, unless they are domiciled (permanently resident) in Singapore; or
- is a person whose name has been expunged from the register or the register of electors under the Presidential Elections Act, and who has not yet had their name restored to the register.

A person is deemed to be ordinarily resident in Singapore on 1 January of a year if they have resided in Singapore for an aggregate of 30 days during the three years immediately preceding 1 January, even if they are not actually resident in Singapore on that date. However, such a person is not entitled to have their name entered or retained in any register of electors if:

- they are serving a sentence of imprisonment in any prison, jail or other place of detention outside Singapore; or
- there is in force against them a warrant of arrest issued by a Singapore court because they have been accused or convicted by a Singapore court of an offence against any written law punishable with more than 12 months' imprisonment.

The prime minister may from time to time, but not later than three years after the last general election, direct that the electoral registers be revised; and may, before a general election, require the registers to be brought up to date by reference to a particular year. After registers have been prepared or updated, they are made available for public inspection to enable people to submit claims to be included in registers or to raise objections concerning the inclusion of other people in the registers. After all claims and objections have been dealt with, the registers are certified as correct.

== Election procedure ==
=== Issuance of writ of election ===
The election process begins when the president, acting on Cabinet's advice, issues a writ of election addressed to the returning officer, who is the official responsible for overseeing the election. The writ specifies the date when the nomination of candidates is to be taken (which must not be earlier than five days nor later than one month from the date of the writ), and the places of nomination.

The returning officer issues a notice stating that the writ of election has been issued by the president and stipulating the date, time and places for nomination of candidates, the documents that candidates must submit on nomination day, and the amount of the deposit that must be lodged. This notice must be issued at least four clear days before nomination day.

=== Application for minority certificate ===
Any person who wishes to participate in an election as a minority candidate in a GRC must, after the date of notice of the writ of election and at least two clear days before nomination day, apply to the Malay Community Committee or the Indian and Other Minority Communities Committee for a certificate stating that they are a person belonging to the Malay, Indian or some other minority community. Certificates to this effect will be issued by the respective committees not later than the day before nomination day.

=== Political donations ===
Under the Political Donations Act, candidates for general elections may only receive political donations from Singapore citizens who are at least 21 years old, or Singapore-controlled companies which carry on business wholly or mainly in Singapore. The receipt of anonymous donations is prohibited, except for anonymous donations totalling less than $5,000 received during a period starting with the date 12 months before the date when the candidate makes the declaration referred to below and ending with nomination day.

After the date of the writ of election and at least two clear days before nomination day, a candidate or prospective candidate must provide the Registrar of Political Donations with a report stating all the donations received from permissible donors that amount to at least $10,000 received during the 12 months preceding the declaration mentioned in the next sentence. They must also submit to the Registrar a declaration stating, to the best of their knowledge and belief, that they did not receive any other donations required to be mentioned in the donation report, and that only donations from permissible donors or allowable anonymous donations were accepted. If this paperwork is in order, the Registrar will issue a political donation certificate not later than the eve of nomination day stating that the candidate has complied with the provisions of the Act.

=== Nomination ===
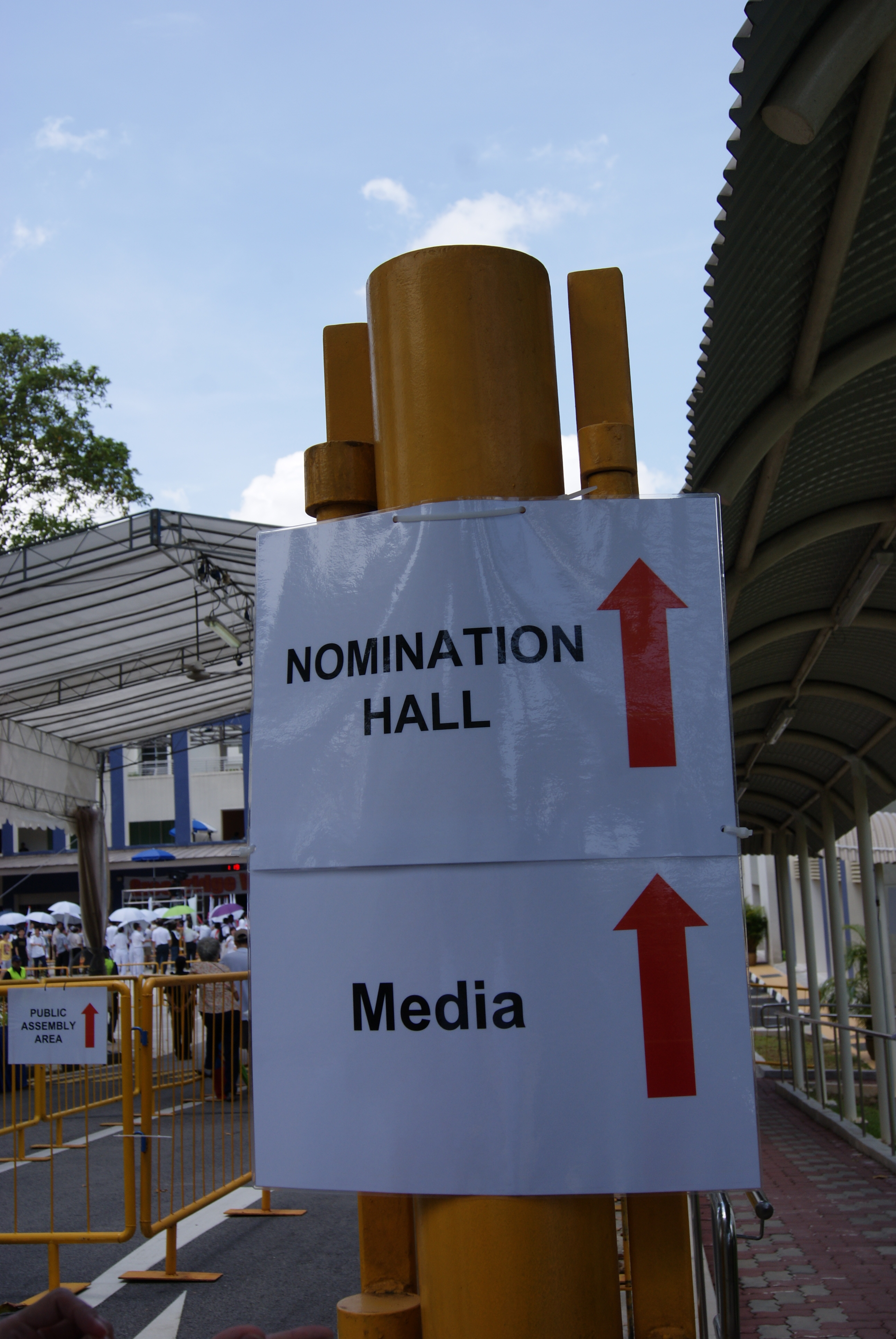
A sign pointing to the nomination hall at Greenridge Secondary School in Bukit Panjang, the nomination centre for Bukit Panjang SMC and Holland–Bukit Timah GRC at the 2011 general election

On nomination day, the returning officer and their representatives will be present at designated nomination centres between 11:00 am and 12:00 noon to receive prospective candidates' nomination papers, political donation certificates, and minority certificates (if required). Each nomination paper must contain a statement signed by the prospective candidate that they consent to the nomination; must include a statutory declaration by the prospective candidate that they are qualified to be elected; and must be signed by a proposer, a seconder, and four or more persons as assentors, each of whom must be a person on the register of electors for the electoral division in which the person seeks election. Since the 2011 Presidential election, candidates are also recommended to submit their recent passport photo with a size of no more than 2 MB and 400 x 514 pixels, to the Election Department as photographs are printed to the ballot paper for better identification.

In addition, between the date of the writ of election and 12:00 noon on nomination day, candidates are required to, either by physical form or through online payment lodge with the returning officer the election deposit equal to 8% of the total allowances payable to an MP in the preceding calendar year, rounded to the nearest $500. The exact amount of the deposit is specified in the notice of the writ of election issued by the returning officer. (Note: For the 2025 general election, the amount of the deposit was $13,500 per candidate. The figure is multiplied depending on the type of contest, either being tripled for Presidential election contests, or the number of candidates in a team for contests inside a GRC.) A candidate (or a group of candidates) who subsequently polls under than one-eighth of the total number of valid votes in the electoral division they contest but who is not elected would result in the forfeiture of the deposit, which is then paid into the Consolidated Fund (the Government's main bank account).

Nomination papers and certificates must be personally delivered to the returning officer in duplicate by the person seeking nomination. The person's proposer, seconder and at least four assentors must also be present in person; any authorized proxy representatives may also allow to represent candidates in-person if the candidate is unable to come on person such as illness. Each nomination paper is then posted outside the place of nomination; and candidates, their proposers, seconders, assentors and one other person appointed by each candidate to be present may examine the nomination papers of other candidates which have been received for that electoral division. Candidates may object to other candidates' nomination papers on the following grounds only:

- the description of the candidate is insufficient to identify them;
- the nomination paper does not comply with or was not delivered in accordance with the requirements of the law;
- it is apparent from the contents of the nomination paper that the candidate is not capable of being elected an MP;
- the requirements for elections in a GRC have not been complied with (for instance, the candidates are not all from the same political party or there is no minority candidate); and/or
- that a candidate has not lodged the required deposit.

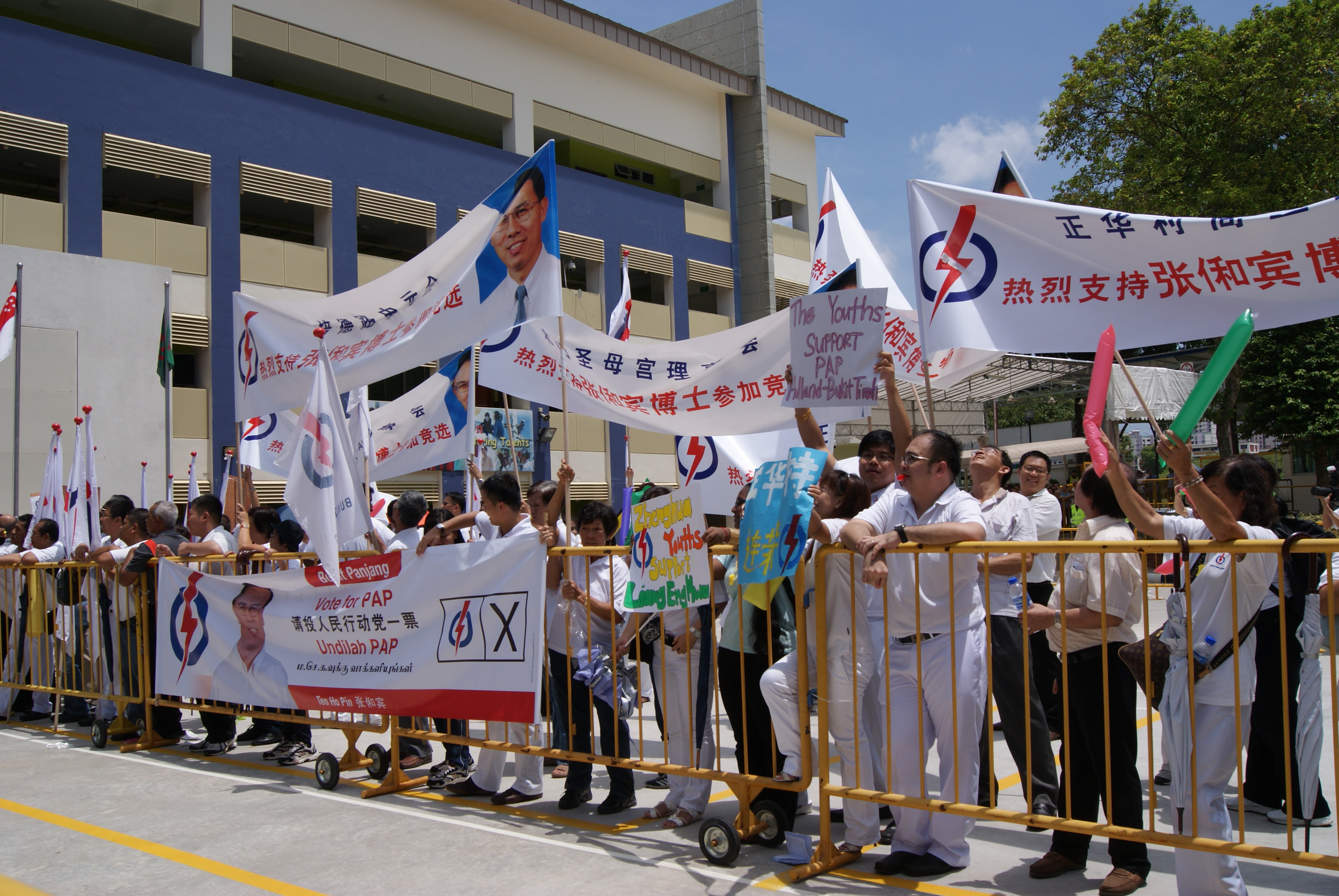
People's Action Party supporters at the Bukit Panjang SMC and Holland–Bukit Timah GRC nomination centre

The returning officer may themselves lodge objections. All objections must be made between 11:00 am and 12:30 pm on nomination day. The returning officer must then, with the least possible delay, decide on the validity of the objections made and inform candidates of their decision. If any objection is allowed, the grounds of the decision must be provided. The rejection of any objection is final and cannot be challenged in court, but any objections that are allowed may be reversed on application to an election judge. Under the rules, each candidate may only be nominated in one electoral division at a general election only once, and multiple nominations are void.

At the close of the nomination period, where there is more than one candidate in an SMC or more than one group of candidates in a GRC, the election is adjourned for a poll to be taken, otherwise, the election is uncontested and the returning officer will declare that the candidate has or the group of candidates have been elected. The returning officer issues a notice of contested election which states when polling day will be (which must not be earlier than the 10th day nor later than the 56th day after publication of the notice); and information such as the names of the candidates, their proposers and seconders, the symbols allocated to candidates which will be printed on ballot papers, and the locations of polling stations. After the announcement, candidates may present acceptance speeches accompanied by at least two subscribers, with one-minute for SMCs and three-minutes for GRCs. Two bell chimes will sound during the last 10 seconds, after which the microphones will be switched off.

=== Campaigning ===
==== Election agents ====
On or before nomination day, every candidate must declare to the returning officer the name of one person who will act as their election agent. This person is legally responsible for the conduct of the candidate's political campaign. In the case of a group of candidates contesting a GRC, a principal election agent must be appointed from among the candidates' election agents. Candidates may name themselves as their own election agents.

Election agents are required to appoint candidates' paid polling agents (persons who oversee polling at polling stations on behalf of candidates), clerks and messengers; hire committee rooms for the use of candidates; pay for expenses incurred for the conduct or management of the election; and receive money from third parties for election expenses.

==== Election expenses, and illegal and corrupt practices ====
The maximum amount which a candidate or their election agent can pay or incur for an election campaign is $5 for each elector in an SMC, or for each elector divided by the number of candidates in the group standing for election in a GRC. (Note: The cap was raised over time to account for cost inflation. The limit was $2.50 prior to the 2001 election. The amount has since raised to $3 in 2001, then $3.50 in 2011, then $4 in 2015. The limit is currenntly set at $5 as of the last change in the 2025 election.) The following expenses are illegal practices:

- Paying to bring voters to or from the poll, except if certain voters need to cross the sea or a river to reach a polling station.
- Letting, lending, employing, hiring or borrowing a motor vehicle to bring voters to or from the poll.
- Paying any voter for the use of a house, land, building or premises for exhibiting any address, bill or notice, unless that voter's ordinary business is that of an advertising agent.

The penalty for committing in illegal practice is a fine of up to $2,000 and barred from being registered as an elector or participating in the election for three years within the date of conviction; if the person has been elected an MP prior to conviction, the seat is also vacated.

The following acts are corrupt practices:

- Bribery. Committing an act of bribery involves doing any one of a number of acts to induce a person to vote or refrain from voting or to reward them for having done so, such as giving or lending money; and giving or procuring an office or employment. It is also bribery for a person to procure or promise to procure that a voter exercise their vote in a certain way or that a candidate be elected as an MP in return for some inducement; to give money to someone else, knowing that they will use the money for bribery at an election; to accept an inducement for voting or not voting or agreeing to do so; and to induce a person to consent to being nominated as a candidate, or refrain or withdraw from being a candidate in return for some inducement.
- False statements. It is an offence to make or publish, before or during an election for the purpose of affecting the return of a candidate, any false statement of fact relating to the personal character or conduct of the candidate; or, in order to promote or procure the election of a particular candidate, to make any false statement about the withdrawal of another candidate.
- Personation. Personation is committed when a person applies for a ballot paper in the name of some other person, whether living, dead or fictitious; or, having already voted at an election, applies for another ballot paper to vote again.
- Treating. Treating is corruptly giving or providing, or paying in whole or part for, any food, drink, refreshment, cigarette, entertainment or other thing, or any money or ticket or other means to enable such things to be obtained, in order to corruptly influence a person to vote or refrain from voting, or to induce the person to attend an election meeting or reward them for having done so.
- Undue influence. When a person makes use of or threatens to make use of force, violence or restraint, or inflicts or threatens to inflict temporal or spiritual injury, damage, harm or loss on a person to induce them to vote or refrain from voting, or to punish them for having done so; or uses abduction, duress or some fraudulent scheme to impede or prevent a person's free exercise of their vote, or to compel or induce them to vote or refrain from voting, this amounts to the offence of undue influence.

The penalty for bribery, personation, treating and undue influence is a fine of up to $5,000 or imprisonment of up to three years or both; candidates declaring false statements is liable to be fined or imprisoned up to 12 months or both. Similar to illegal practices, candidates convicted are also disqualified from involvement in elections and the vacation of elected seats (if elected) for up to seven years upon conviction.

==== Election advertising ====
All election posters must bear the election department's stamp or chop if it is a legal poster approved by the election department.

===== Election surveys and exit polls =====
Between the day the writ of election is issued and the close of all polling stations on polling day, it is an offence to publish the results of any election survey, which is defined as an opinion survey of how electors will vote at an election, or of the preferences of electors concerning any candidate or group of candidates or any political party or issue with which an identifiable candidate or group of candidates is associated at an election. It is also an offense to publish on polling day before all the polling stations have closed any exit poll, that is, "any statement relating to the way in which voters have voted at the election where that statement is (or might reasonably be taken to be) based on information given by voters after they have voted", or "any forecast as to the result of the election which is (or might reasonably be taken to be) based on information so given". The penalty for both of these offences is a fine of up to $1,500, imprisonment of up to 12 months, or both.

On 20 June 2013, the police, acting on directions of the Attorney-General's Chambers, gave Singapore Press Holdings ("SPH") and Warren Fernandez, respectively the publisher and editor of The Straits Times, a warning in-lieu of prosecution for having published a voters' poll in the newspaper on 10 January. As this was the day after the writ of election for the 2013 by-election in Punggol East was issued, the publication of the poll contravened the ban against publishing election surveys during the blackout period. SPH accepted that an "internal lapse" had occurred. Similarly, on 2 August 2016, police issued the same aforementioned warning for a similar infraction of publishing an election survey made by The Middle Ground during the cooling-off day for the 2016 by-election in Bukit Batok.

===== Internet advertising =====
Two forms of political advertising on the Internet are permitted during election time. First, during the election period – that is, the period between the day the writ of election is issued and the start of polling day – political parties, candidates or election agents may use the Internet to further candidates' campaigns, including using websites, chat rooms or discussion forums, video and photograph sharing or hosting websites, e-mail, micro-blog posts (such as Twitter), SMS and MMS messages, digital audio and video files, electronic media applications, and blogs and social networking services (such as Facebook). Election advertising sent by e-mail, micro-blog post, SMS or MMS must contain a functioning e-mail address or mobile phone number to enable recipients to indicate that they do not wish to receive further messages from the sender.

However, the Internet may not be used to publish the following:

- Election surveys.
- Appeals for money or other property in association with a representation that it will be applied for the objects or activities of any political party or for the promotion of any candidate or group of candidates.
- Any facility enabling members of the public to search for unlawful election advertising.
- Party political films not permitted by the Films Act.

Secondly, when candidates wish to publish election advertising on the Internet during the campaign period – that is, the period from the closure of the place of nomination on nomination day after the election is adjourned to enable a poll to be taken, to the start of the eve of polling day – they must provide to the returning officer, within 12 hours after the start of the period, declarations containing information on all the online platforms the advertising has appeared on in that time. Subsequently, a similar declaration must be provided before election advertising is published on such platforms.

Individuals who are Singapore citizens may publish on the Internet material that amounts to election advertising without having to comply with the above regulations so long as they do so personally and not at the direction of another person or on that person's behalf, and do not receive any benefit for doing so.

In a statement by the Election Department, any unpaid online election advertisements can be published by anyone if desired, but only candidates and their election agents can publish paid advertisements, and need to be declared to the Returning Officer by the candidate or election agent under existing requirements. Posting or republishing of ads (which include sharing, resharing, reposting or boosting existing advertisements) can be done at anytime before Cooling-off day.

On 16 April 2025, ELD also announced new rules in Online Campaigning, where deepfake technology (such as digitally manipulated online material or advertising that misrepresent a candidate's speech or action) are banned.

===== Political films and broadcasts, and campaign recordings =====
The Films Act defines a party political film as a film "(a) which is an advertisement made by or on behalf of any political party in Singapore or any body whose objects relate wholly or mainly to politics in Singapore, or any branch of such party or body; or (b) which is made by any person and directed towards any political end in Singapore". A film is regarded as being "directed towards a political end in Singapore" if it:

(a) contains wholly or partly any matter which, in the opinion of the Board [of Film Censors], is intended or likely to affect voting in any election or national referendum in Singapore; or

(b) contains wholly or partly references to or comments on any political matter which, in the opinion of the Board, are either partisan or biased; and "political matter" includes but is not limited to any of the following:

(i) an election or a national referendum in Singapore;
(ii) a candidate or group of candidates in an election;
(iii) an issue submitted or otherwise before electors in an election or a national referendum in Singapore;
(iv) the Government or a previous Government or the opposition to the Government or previous Government;
(v) a Member of Parliament;
(vi) a current policy of the Government or an issue of public controversy in Singapore; or
(vii) a political party in Singapore or any body whose objects relate wholly or mainly to politics in Singapore, or any branch of such party or body.

In general, it is an offence for importing, reproducing, distributing or exhibiting any party political film, with a penalty of up to $100,000 fine or imprisonment of up to two years or both. However, a film is not regarded as a party political film if it is:

- one made only for news reporting by a licensed broadcasting service;
- one made only to inform or educate people on the procedures and polling times for an election or national referendum in Singapore;
- one that consists of a live recording of a lawful performance, assembly or procession that does not show any event, person or situation in a dramatic way;
- one that records a lawful event or occasion for those who took part in the event or occasion or are connected with them;
- a documentary having no animation and made entirely of an accurate account that shows actual events, persons or situations, but not a film that is an unscripted or "reality" type programme or that depicts those events, persons or situations dramatically; or
- a film created by a candidate or a political party without animation and dramatic elements made up entirely of the party's manifesto, or the candidate or party's ideology or declaration of policies that the candidate or party's candidates will seek to be elected on at a parliamentary or presidential election.

In addition, during the period starting with the day when the writ of election is issued and ending with the start of the eve of polling day, election campaign recordings are exempted from the requirement that films must be submitted to the Board of Film Censors for review, and may be published on and distributed through the Internet. Such recordings are unmodified live recordings of lawful performances, assemblies or processions held in connection with election activities which do not depict the proceedings in a dramatic way or consist of unscripted or "reality" type programmes.

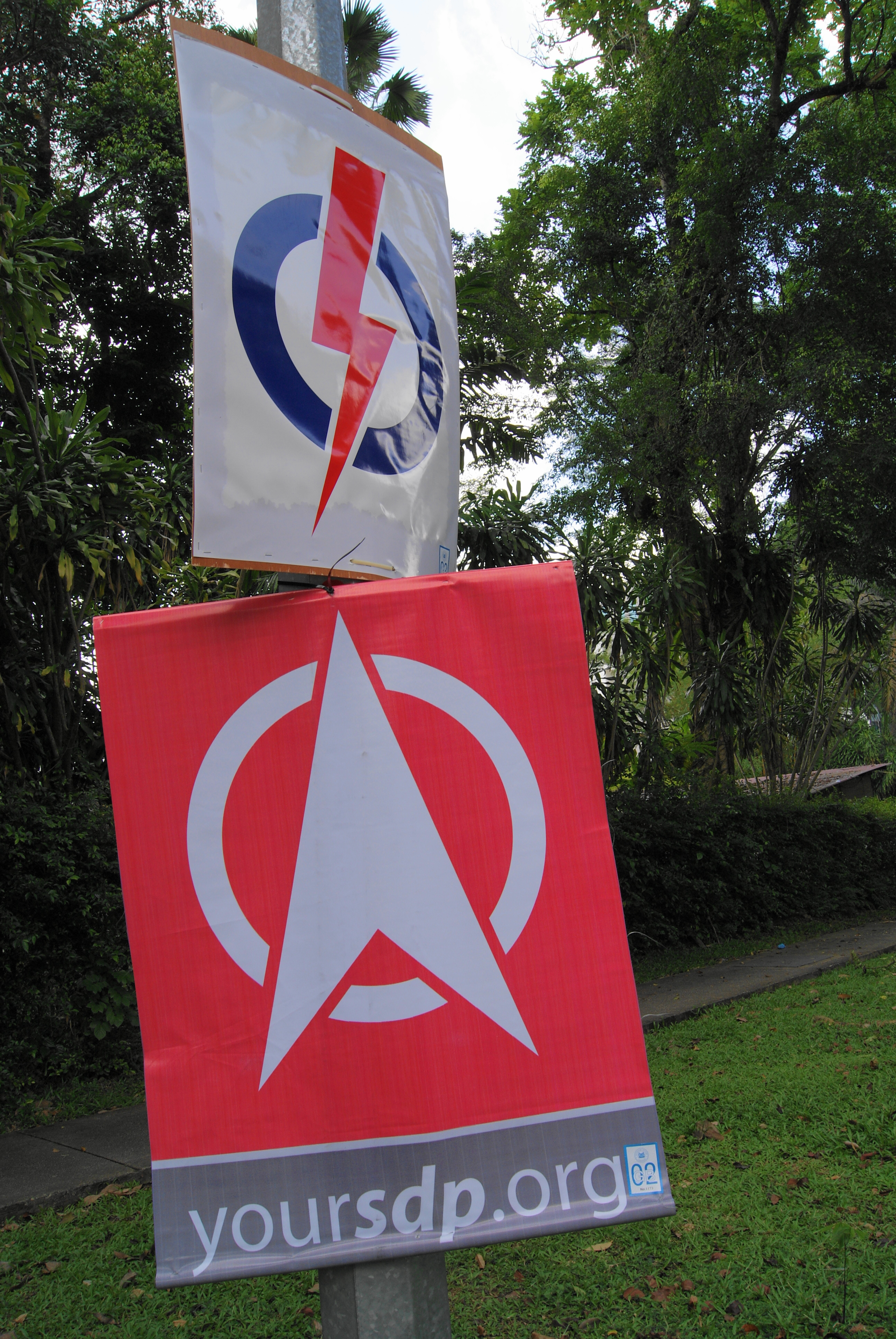
Posters of the People's Action Party (top) and Singapore Democratic Party hung from a lamppost on Clementi Road in Holland–Bukit Timah GRC during the 2011 general election

Under content codes issued by the Media Development Authority, political advertising is not permitted on radio or television. Instead the Authority arranges for pre-recorded party political broadcasts to be made on radio and TV, one on the day after nomination day and the other on the eve of polling day. Only political parties fielding at least six candidates at an election are eligible to make a broadcast; independent candidates may not do so. Party political broadcasts must be delivered by candidates, and each broadcast must consist of a single script in each of the four official languages of Singapore: Malay, Mandarin, Tamil and English. The duration of the permitted broadcast is proportional to the number of candidates each party is fielding, with a minimum of 2.5 minutes airtime (and up to 13 minutes for a party with 89-93 seats, and 14 minutes for 97 seats). The number of candidates fielded also determines the order of broadcasts, with the broadcast of the party fielding the smallest number of candidates on first and that of the party fielding the largest number last.

The 2020 election introduced another "one-off specially arranged" televised series, "Constituency Political Broadcast", which are pre-recorded broadcasts featuring candidates airtime to persuade voters on television, as a replacement on physical rallies which was disallowed due to the ongoing COVID-19 pandemic. Like Party Political Broadcasts, Constituency Political Broadcast allows the use of four official languages but can be used altogether instead of a single language, and any candidates are eligible, including independents. The duration for the broadcast was three minutes times the number of candidates and the alphabetical order of the constituencies determines the order of broadcast; each segment will feature either one GRC or two SMCs before commercials. The Constituency Political Broadcast did not return in 2025.

===== Banners and posters =====
Once nomination proceedings have ended on nomination day, the returning officer issues to each candidate, group of candidates or their election agents a permit authorising banners and posters to be displayed. The permit specifies the maximum number of banners and posters that may be displayed, any restrictions as to the places where or manner in which they must not be displayed, and the period after polling day within which they must be removed. All banners and posters must have a stamp bearing the returning officer's official mark on the bottom right-hand corner. They may not be displayed within 200 metres (660 ft) of any polling station or any shorter distance as the returning officer may specify. Among other things, it is an offence punishable by a fine of up to $1,000 or imprisonment not exceeding 12 months to alter, deface, destroy, obliterate or remove any banner or poster, or to display a banner or poster in such a way as to obscure any banner or poster already displayed. An additional rule added on 15 April 2025 that they are not allowed to post any new banners, flags and posters until the start of campaigning, with exceptions for some banners, flags or posters that are used as permanent location markers, or existing ones that were placed in the constituency prior to the issuance (such as Town Council banners); Aetos Security Management could take down posters at its own discretion if there were violations.

===== Printed documents =====
All election advertising contained in printed documents must bear on their face or, if there is more than one side of printed matter, on the first or last pages, the names and addresses of their printers, publishers, and the persons for whom the advertising was published. Failure to comply with this requirement amounts to a corrupt practice and is punishable with a fine of up to $1,000 or imprisonment of up to 12 months or both, along with the election disqualification (see Election expenses, and illegal and corrupt practices).

==== Election meetings ====
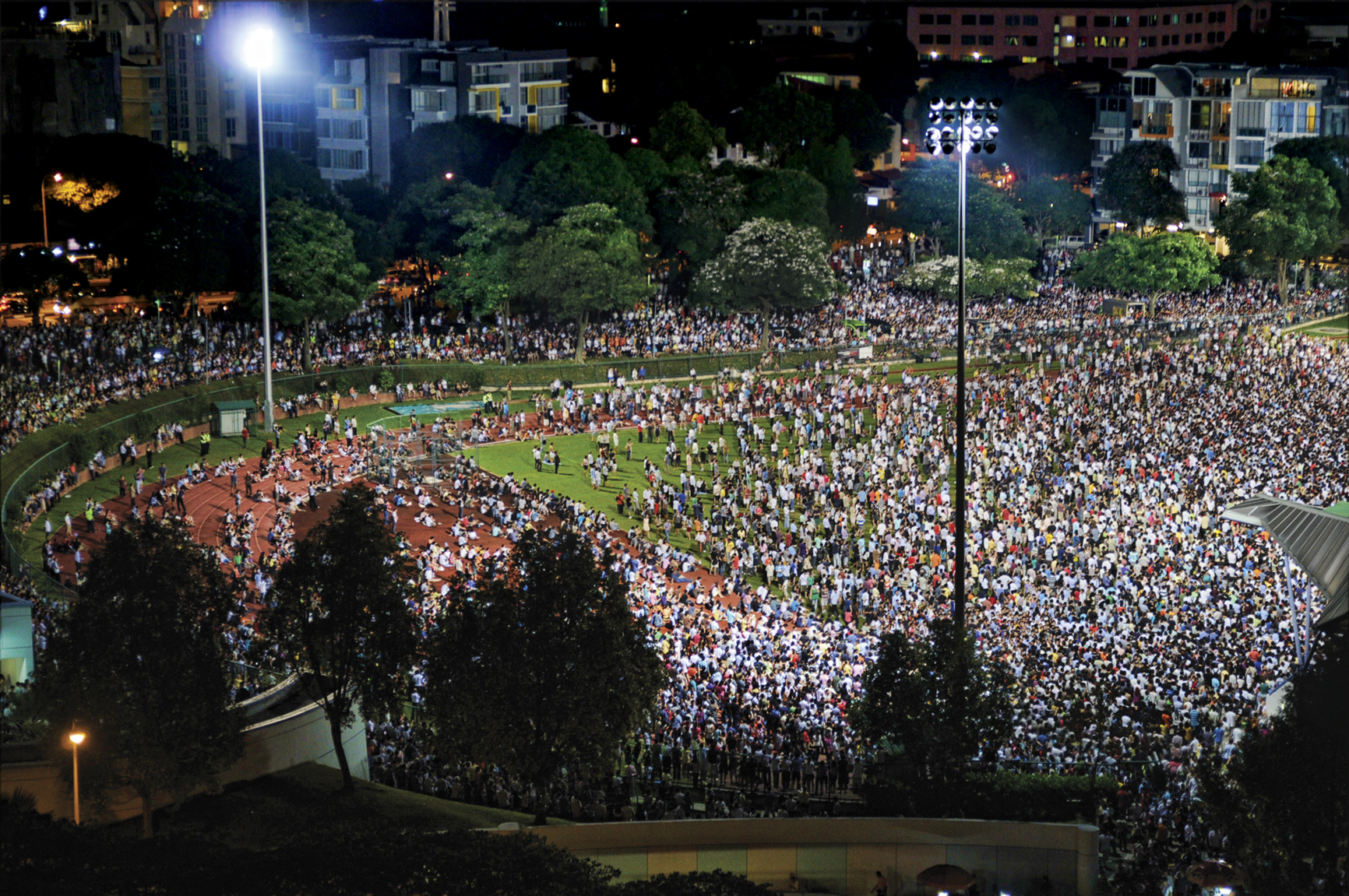
A Workers' Party rally at the 2011 general election in Serangoon Stadium on 29 April 2011

For election meetings such as rallies to be held, permits must be applied for from the Commissioner of Police at the Police Elections Liaison Office in the Police Cantonment Complex. The venues for rallies are fixed by the police, and candidates may ballot for rally sites if there are multiple applications for a given time slot. Although meetings can normally be held at Speakers' Corner without applying for a police permit, this privilege does not apply during election periods.

=== Polling day ===
==== Cooling-off day ====
Introduced in 2010, legal changes were assessed on the eve of polling day for elections where campaigning and election advertising is prohibited under the Presidential Elections Act and the Parliamentary Elections Act, though the following activities are exceptions:

- distributing a book or promoting the sale of a book for not less than its commercial value if the book was planned to be published regardless of whether there was to be an election;
- publishing news relating to an election in a licensed newspaper in any medium or in a licensed radio or television broadcast;
- conveying one's own political views on a non-commercial basis to another individual by telephonic or electronic transmission;
- election advertising lawfully published or displayed before the start of the eve of polling day on the Internet which is not changed after its publication or display; and
- the continued lawful display of posters and banners already displayed before the start of the eve of polling day.

Prime Minister Lee Hsien Loong justified the changes as enabling voters to think dispassionately about the candidates' stands on issues raised, and reducing the chance of public disorder.

==== Polling ====
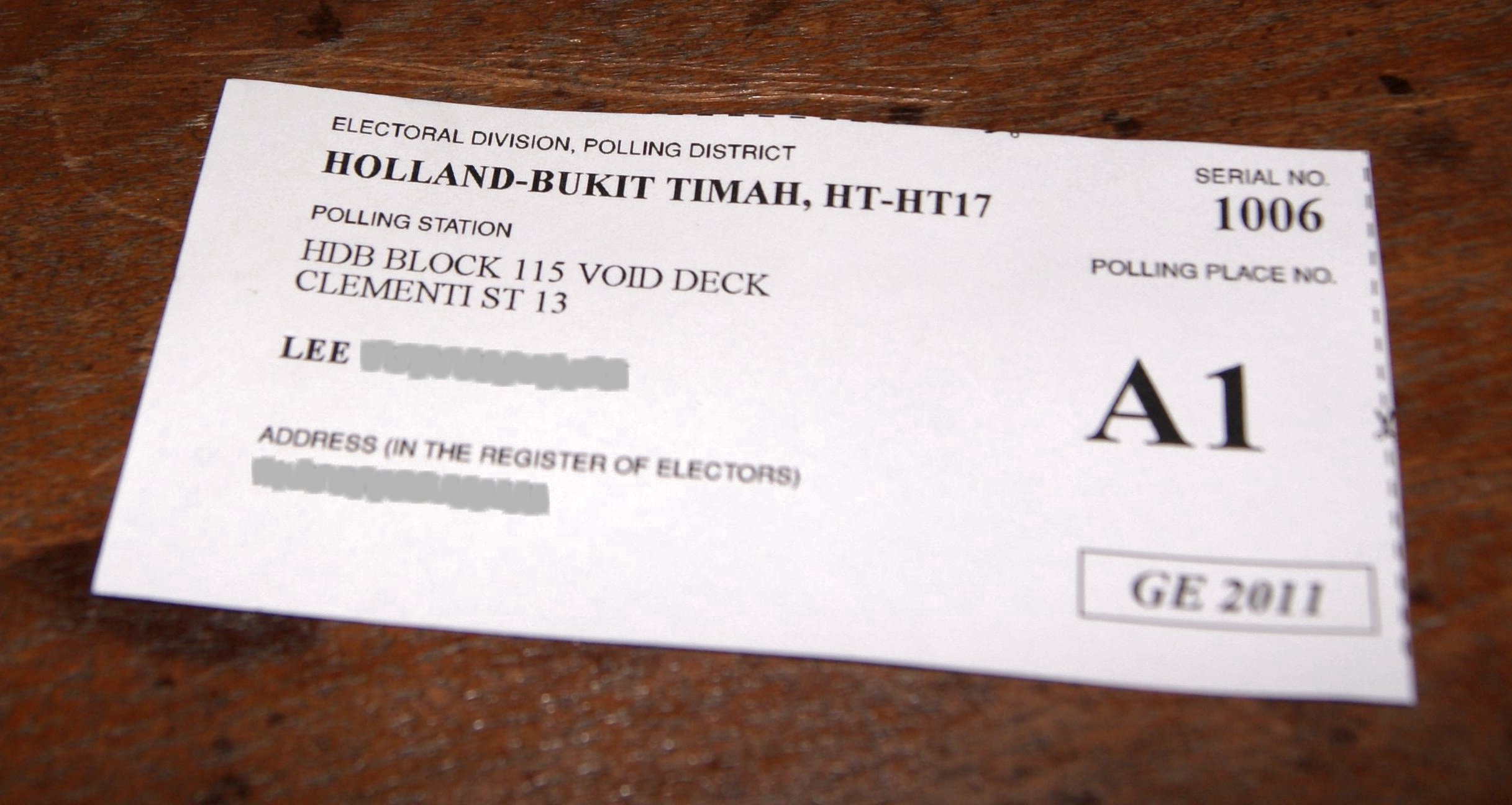
A poll card issued for the 2011 general election

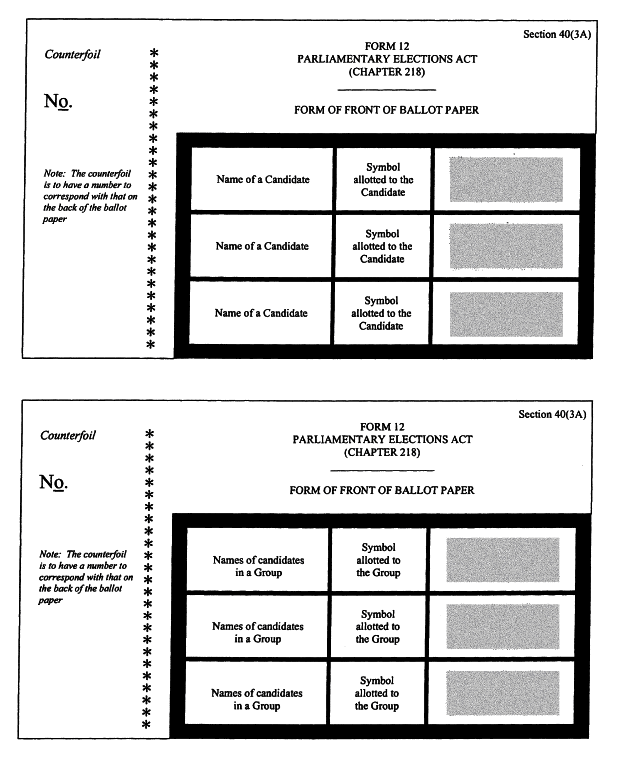
A form showing the layouts of the fronts of ballot papers used during general elections in SMCs (top) and GRCs

Badges, favours, flags, rosettes, symbols, sets of colours, advertisements, handbills, placards, posters and replica voting papers may not be carried, worn, used or displayed by any person or on any vehicle as political propaganda, although candidates may wear replicas of the symbols allotted to them for election purposes. In addition, holding election meetings and canvassing are not permitted on the day before polling day and polling day itself. Canvassing involves trying to persuade a person to vote or not to vote in a particular way, or visiting a voter for an election-related purpose at home or at their workplace. It is also an offence to exercise undue influence on any person at or near a polling station, for instance, by trying to find out the identity of any person entering a polling station, recording voters' particulars, and waiting outside or loitering within 200 metres (660 ft) of polling stations.

Voters receive poll cards informing them of the polling stations where they can cast their votes in person. Polling day at a general election is a public holiday, and voting is compulsory. Unless the returning officer decides otherwise, polling stations are open from 8:00 am to 8:00 pm on polling day. (Note: The 2020 election was an exception, where the polls were extended for two hours until 10:00 pm, citing long queues. Procedures for vote counting were otherwise unaffected.) To vote, voters must go to the polling stations assigned to them. Applying for a ballot paper or voting in the name of someone else, or attempting to vote more than once, amounts to the offence of personation. If a person claiming to be a voter named in the electoral register turns up at a polling station after someone also claiming to be that voter has already voted, the second person is permitted to cast what is called a "tendered vote" using a ballot paper of a different colour after taking an oath to confirm his identity.

Voters are then given a ballot paper with an area to state their choice by marking it with a cross. The paper is then folded vertically in half, then slotted into a ballot box. As of the 2020 Singaporean general election, a self-inking device (such as a pen and later, a stamp introduced in the 2023 Singaporean presidential election) will also be provided, though ELD advised voters to bring a pen as standby in the event the stamp's ink ran out.

==== Overseas voting ====
Introduced in 2001 but not used until the 2006 elections, (Note: The overseas voting was enacted by the government on May 15, 2001. It was originally planned to be used in the subsequent election, but this feature was suspended per security reasons following the September 11 attacks. It was also not used in the 2025 presidential election because of a walkover.) voters are also allowed to cast their votes aboard outside Singapore at any one of the designated overseas polling stations (Note: As of 2025, there are ten overseas polling stations assigned by the ELD, located at six countries. They are in Australia (Canberra), China (Beijing, Hong Kong and Shanghai), Japan (Tokyo), United Arab Emirates (Dubai), United Kingdom (London), and United States (New York, San Francisco and Washington D.C.).)) in addition to the eligibilities as a local voter, an additional criteria for eligibility as an overseas voter is that the voter must provide both a recent contact address (Local Contact Address (LCA)) and an overseas address on the voter's residence registered with the Immigration & Checkpoints Authority (ICA), and has resided in Singapore for an aggregate of at least 30 days during the 3-year period before the cut-off date.

Polling stations open based on the times from the Singapore time zone (UTC+08:00), from 8 am to 8 pm. (Note: Per differences across Time zone, only the overseas polls held in China shares the same time zone as Singapore. United States uses either the Pacific or Eastern time zones (UTC-08:00 and UTC−05:00, respectively), United Kingdom uses UTC+00:00, Dubai uses UTC+04:00, Tokyo uses UTC+09:00, and Canberra uses UTC+10:00. Both United States and United Kingdom are also subjected to Daylight Saving Time at some certain months of the year.) Similar to votes cast locally, voting is also compulsory and can only be done once. After voting ended, the ballot boxes are sealed and are transported back to Singapore; the counting is conducted a few days after the election ended and once all the boxes are safely returned, though the counts of the votes do not affect the eventual outcome as the overseas electorate is much smaller, ranging from 558 during the debut to 8,630 in the 2025 election.

As of the 2023 presidential election and in the 2025 general election, postal voting is implemented for overseas voters. A ballot is available to postal voters via the ELD's online voter services after Nomination Day (if there is a contest), where they download and print a copy of it along with a pre-paid return envelope. Valid envelopes must be postmarked and have to be reached to Singapore before Polling day and by Returning Officer within 10 days afterwards.

==== Results ====
After the poll closes, the presiding officer of each polling station seals the ballot boxes without opening them. Candidates or their polling agents may also affix their own seals to the ballot boxes. The ballot boxes are then taken to counting centres to be opened and the ballots counted. According to the guidance issued to voters by the Elections Department, votes should be marked with a cross. However, even if this guidance is not followed, a vote is valid if the ballot paper clearly indicates the voter's intention and the candidate or group of candidates for whom they vote. A vote will be rejected by the returning officer as invalid if it:

- does not bear a complete authentication mark or is not initialled by the presiding officer at a polling station;
- contain votes for more than one candidate or group of candidates;
- has been written upon or marked in a way that identifies the voter;
- is blank; or
- is void for uncertainty.

The returning officer must show each ballot paper intended to be rejected to all candidates or their counting agents and hear their views, but makes the final decision as to whether the ballot paper should be rejected or not.

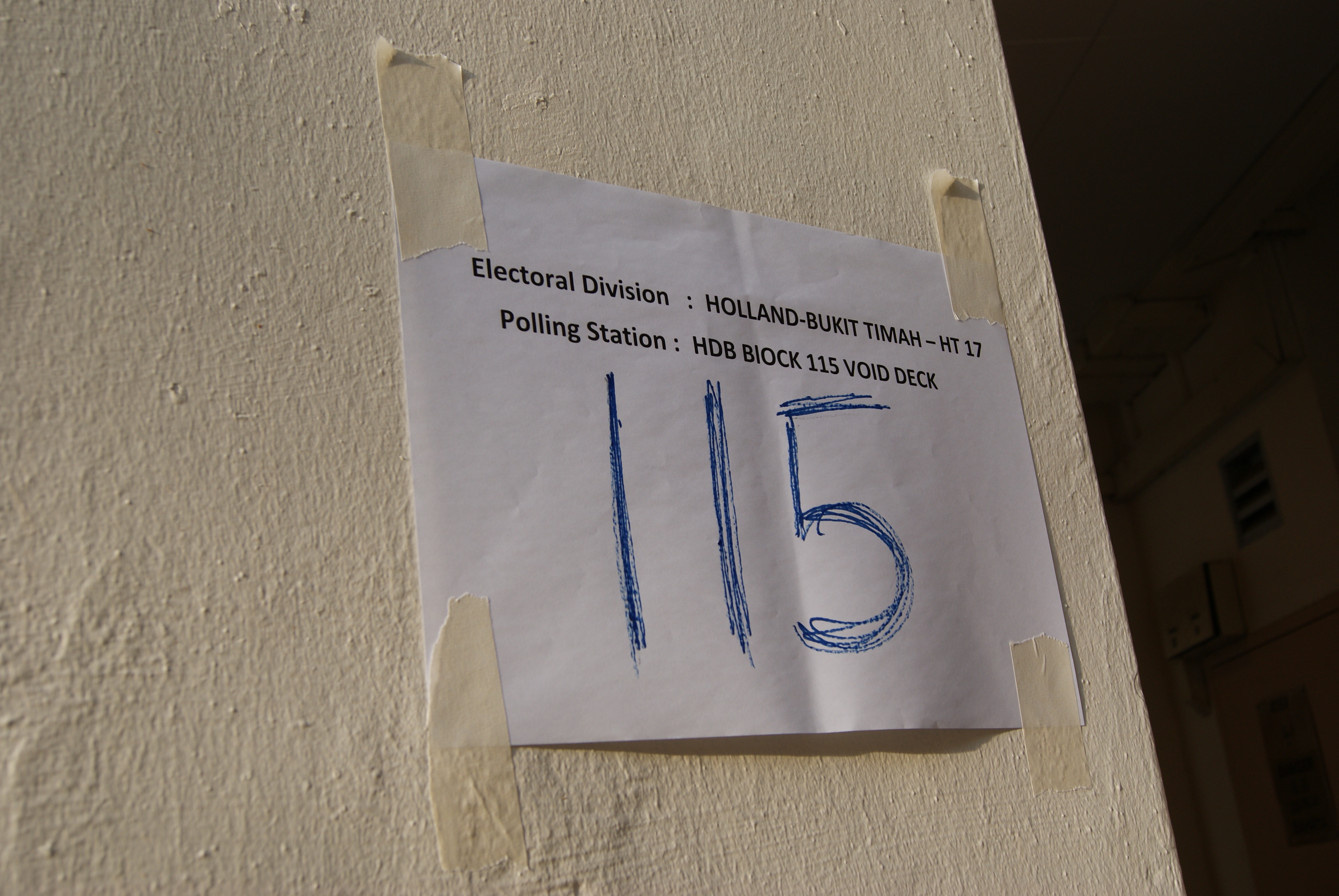
A sign indicating the polling station at the void deck of Block 115 Clementi Street 13 for the 2011 general election

A candidate or his counting agent may ask the returning officer for a recount of votes if the difference between the number of votes for the candidate or group of candidates with the most votes and the number of votes (excluding any rejected and tendered votes) of any other candidate or group of candidates is within a 2% margin. After all counts, and recounts if any, have been completed, the returning officer ascertains whether the total number of electors registered to vote overseas is less than the difference between the number of votes for the two candidates with the highest number of votes. If so, the returning officer declares the candidate(s) with the highest number of votes to be elected as MP(s). If not, the overseas votes may be decisive. The returning officer then states the number of votes cast for each candidate and the date and location where the overseas votes will be counted. Since the 2020 elections, recounts are now triggered automatically.

All officers, clerks, interpreters, candidates and candidates' agents at polling stations must maintain the secrecy of voting in stations. Before the poll is closed, they must not communicate to anyone the name of any elector who has or has not yet voted or their identification number on the electoral register. They are prohibited from communicating information obtained during the counting of votes as to which candidate has been voted for in any particular ballot paper. Furthermore, no person is allowed to try to find out from within a polling station who a voter intends to vote for or has voted for, or to communicate with a voter after he has been given a ballot paper but before he has placed it in a ballot box.

==== Sample counts ====
Introduced during the 2015 elections, sample counts are also done during the vote counting process which prevent speculation and misinformation, while helping election officials check against the election result for that electoral division. 100 votes are selected at random and are weighed according to the size of ballots based on each polling station for the constituency. The counts are published by the assistant returning officer through broadcast and internet before vote counting is complete, which is always shown as an integer. Election Department announced that the sample counts may differ from the actual results within a 4% error margin (at a 95% confidence interval), and advised the public to refer to the returning officer for the actual results.

=== Declaration that election is void ===
A person claiming to have been a candidate at a general election or to have had a right to be elected, or a person who voted or had a right to vote at a general election, may apply to an election judge for a candidate's election to be declared void on any of the following grounds:

- The majority of voters was or might have been prevented from electing their preferred candidate due to a general occurrence of bribery, treating, intimidation or some other form of misconduct or circumstances.
- There was a failure to comply with the Parliamentary Elections Act and this affected the result of the election.
- A corrupt or illegal practice in connection with the election was committed by the candidate, or by an agent of the candidate with his knowledge or consent.
- The candidate personally hired someone as an election agent, canvasser or agent while aware that the person had been found guilty of a corrupt practice within the seven years before he was engaged.
- At the time the candidate was elected, he was disqualified from standing for election.

The Chief Justice or a Supreme Court judge nominated by him acts as the election judge.

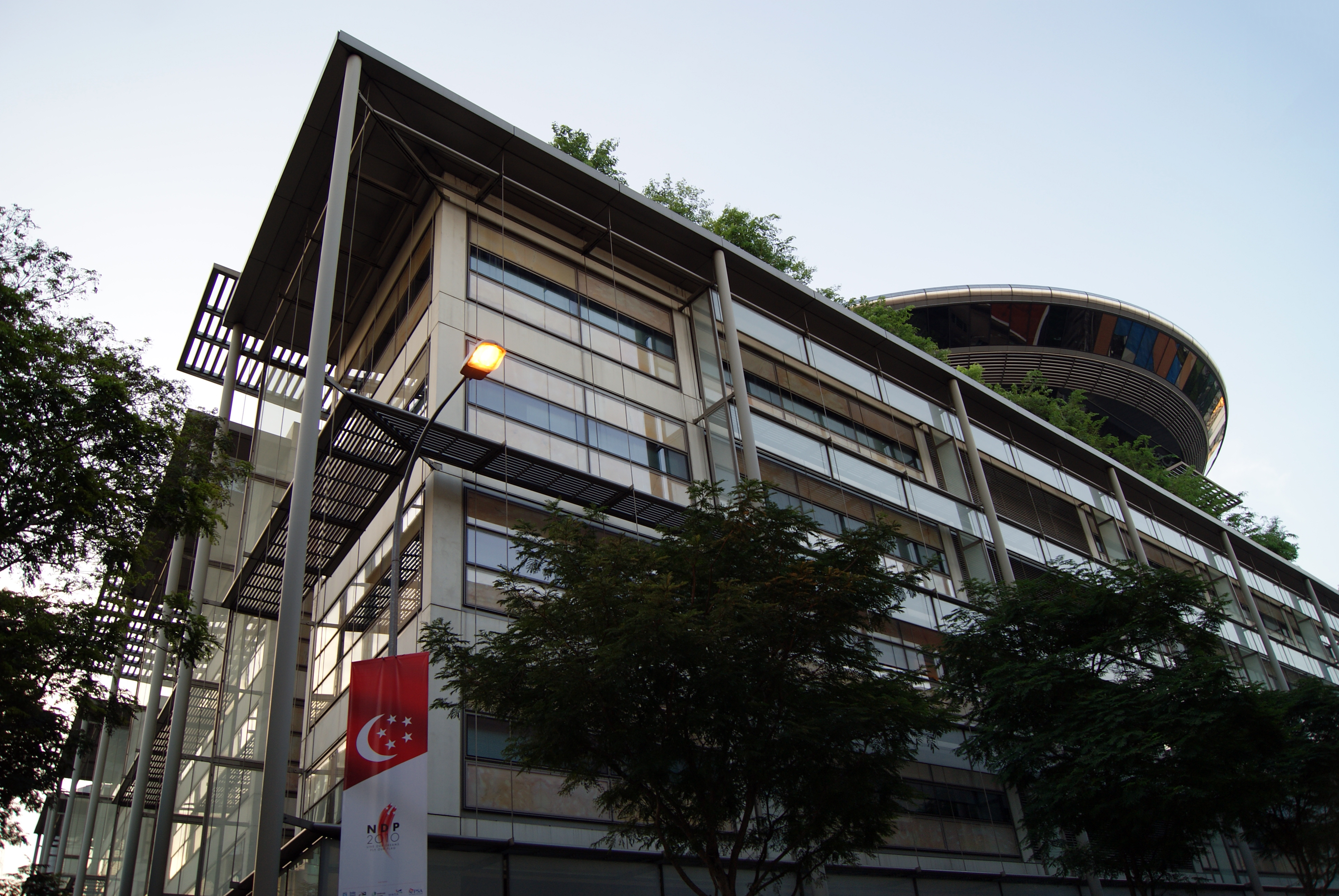
The Supreme Court of Singapore. The validity of a general election is determined by an election judge, who is the Chief Justice or a Supreme Court judge nominated by him.

The applicant for an election to be avoided may ask for a declaration that the election is void, that a particular candidate was wrongfully declared to have been elected, and/or that another candidate was duly elected. The applicant may also request for a scrutiny – that is, a re-examination of the ballot papers – if they allege that an unsuccessful candidate had a majority of lawful votes. When a scrutiny is conducted, the election judge may order a vote to be struck off if the voter was not on the register of electors assigned to the polling station at which the vote was recorded or was not authorised to vote at the station; if the vote was obtained by bribery, treating or undue influence; if the voter committed or induced someone to commit the offence of personation; if the voter cast a vote at a general election in more than one electoral division; and if the vote was for a disqualified candidate and the disqualification was either a matter that the voter was aware of or was sufficiently publicised or widely known. During a scrutiny, a tendered vote that is shown to be valid will be added to the poll if any party to the proceedings asks for the vote to be added. On the other hand, a registered elector's vote will not be struck off at a scrutiny just because he was not qualified to be on the electoral register, and the returning officer's decision as to whether or not a ballot paper should be rejected may not be questioned.

The election judge is empowered to exempt from being an illegal practice any particular act or omission by a candidate, his election agents or any other agent or person in paying a sum, incurring an expense or entering into a contract if it was done in good faith and was due to inadvertence, accidental miscalculation or the like. Similarly, the judge may make an order allowing an authorised excuse for a failure to file a proper return or declaration relating to election expenses if the candidate or his principal election agent shows that he acted in good faith and that there is a reasonable explanation for the shortcoming such as his inadvertence or illness, or the absence, death, illness or misconduct of some other agent, clerk or officer. In particular, the judge may relieve a candidate from the consequences of an act or omission by his principal election agent if he did not sanction or connive in it and took all reasonable means to prevent it.

The election judge certifies his decision, which is final, to the president. The judge must also report to the president whether any corrupt or illegal practice was established to have been committed by or with the knowledge and consent of any candidate or his agent. If a judge intends to report a person who was neither a party to the proceedings nor a candidate claiming he should have been declared elected, that person must be given an opportunity to be heard and to give and call evidence to show why a report should not be made against him. However, where a candidate's agents are found to have been guilty of treating, undue influence or an illegal practice, but the candidate proves that the offences were committed contrary to their orders and without their election agents' sanction or connivance, that all reasonable means were taken to prevent corrupt and illegal practices at the election, that the offences were of a trivial and limited nature, and in other respects the election was free from corrupt or illegal practice, the election is not void.

Depending on whether the judge has determined that the election was valid or void, the election return is confirmed or altered. If the election is declared void, the president is empowered to order that another election be held in the electoral division concerned within one month of the determination. If the election of one MP in a GRC is determined to be void, the election of the other MPs for that constituency is also void.

=== Ballot secrecy ===
Election department ensure the privacy of all registered voters during an election and how the ballot boxes are treated. Prior to the opening hours, the boxes undergo tamperproofing checks and ensure the contents are emptied under the witness of candidates and their polling agents present at the polling station, before being sealed by Presiding Officers (except for opening slots) so that it can be used. After the polls closed, the boxes, along with the slots, are sealed and wrapped before being transported to the designated counting centre by bus under police escort. Upon arrival, the boxes are checked and accounted before it can be opened and emptied to begin vote counting.

After the vote counting ended and results are released, the ballot papers and any other official documents used in the election are placed into separate boxes and sealed; these boxes are transported to the Supreme Court of Singapore where it was kept under safe custody for period of six months after election ended, after which the boxes are transported to the incineration plant (such as Tuas South Incineration Plant) for incineration, unless directed otherwise by order of the President of Singapore. Under the protection act, the process is to ensure all of the voters' identity are not compromised, as contents inside each ballot paper have a unique serial number located on the counterfoil to ensure integrity of the democratic process and strict accounting to avoid infringement and personation. (Note: To date, there were two such cases of delay, both being the sealing of incorrect documents: the first one occurred in the 2006 election where two polling stations in Aljunied GRC had their processed delayed for one week (from November 11, 2006 to November 17, 2006), the second occurred in the 2020 election where one polling station in Pasir Ris-Punggol GRC saw a delay on the process for about one month (from January 16, 2021 to February 9, 2021). In both cases, the ballot boxes for the affected polling stations were destroyed on the original planned date per usual.)

=== Abstention ===
Under constitutionally-required compulsory voting, which was first implemented in 1959, voting is meant to exercise a citizen's fundamental right of citizenship and democracy. After polls closed, any names (and along with the serial numbers) of registered voters who did not cast a vote that day are complied in a list to be sent to the Returning Officer, after which the names are delisted from the registrar of voters of the electoral divisions that they belong to. These voters are also called "non-voters", and they will be ineligible to vote in, or allow to participate, in subsequent elections of any kind. Any non-voters may reinstate their names by submitting an application, either through the online website or counter services at a nearby community centre, to the Registration Officer along with any reason for absence; the fee to restore a name is S$50, but it can be waived if their reasons are valid, such as:

- working overseas (including being on a business trip) at the time of polling day;
- studying overseas at the time of polling day;
- living with their spouse who is working or studying overseas;
- overseas vacation;
- illness, or delivering a baby; or
- any special circumstances that cause a voter unable to vote that day, such as a technical glitch.

Restoration of names are open from the date when the list of non-voters have been complied by ELD until the day the Writ of Election for the next election is issued; if the voter is unable to vote due to unforeseen circumstances, he may pre-apply for his name to be restored to the registers by submitting an application online prior to polling day; however, such cases can still allow the voter to vote, but doing so voids the earlier application. As with the 2023 Presidential election, non-voters are notified through mail and Singpass application with reminders to restore their names back to the register.

== Past elections and latest election ==
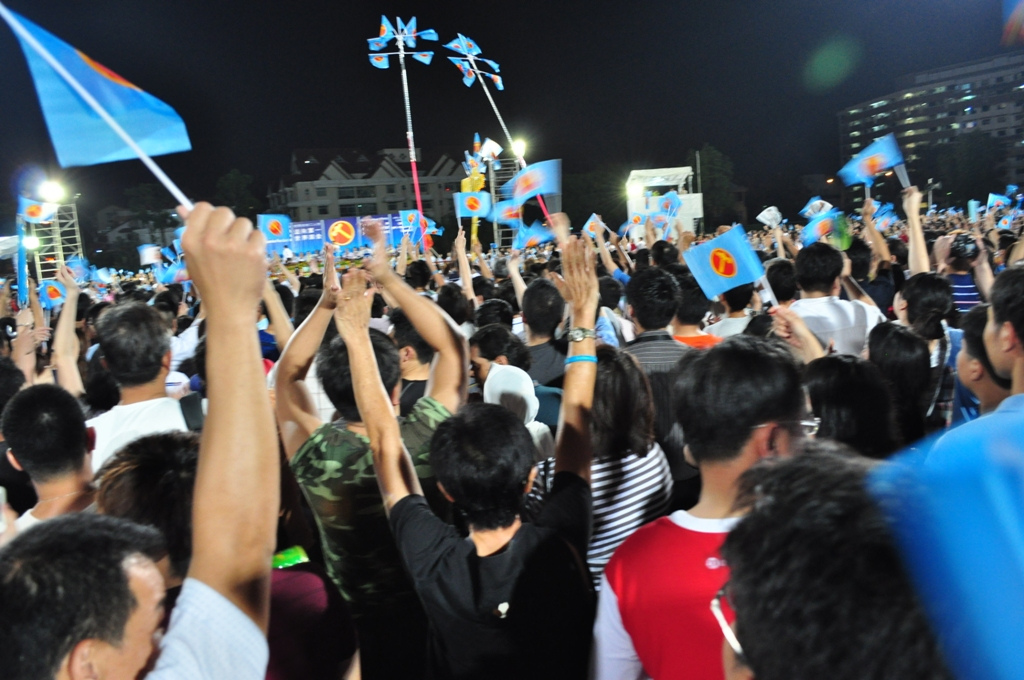
Supporters at a Workers' Party rally at Serangoon Stadium on 29 April 2011 during the 2011 general election

With effect from 3 June 1959, Singapore was granted full internal self-government by the British Government and became known as the State of Singapore. For the first time, Singapore had a fully elected Legislative Assembly. At the 1959 general election held on 30 May that year to give effect to the new constitution, the People's Action Party (PAP) led by Lee Kuan Yew swept into power with 43 out of 51 seats in the Assembly. Since then, the PAP has retained power and formed the Government through successive elections, and Singapore's merger with Malaysia in 1963 and full independence in 1965. In the 1968 general election, the PAP was returned unopposed in all except seven of the 58 constituencies, and won the remaining seats with 84% of the popular vote. Thereafter, every seat in Parliament was held by a PAP MP until Joshua Benjamin Jeyaretnam of the Workers' Party (Singapore) won a 1981 by-election in the Anson constituency. Jeyaretnam retained his seat at the following general election in 1984, at which Chiam See Tong of the Singapore Democratic Party was also elected as representative of Potong Pasir. Between 1984 and 2011, the number of elected parliamentary seats held by opposition parties fluctuated between one (after the 1988 election) and four (1991 election). Between 1988 and 2015, and again from 2020 to 2025, three political parties represented the parliament with the exception of 2015 to 2020 and 2025 onwards, where the parliament had only two parties.

The latest general election in 2025 saw PAP's overall vote share gained by 65.57%, up by 4% from their 2020's result of 61.24% and winning 87 out of 97 seats. The Workers' Party captured the remaining ten seats with two GRCs of five-seat Aljunied GRC and the four-seat Sengkang GRC (also the first time a newly formed constituency was won by the opposition on the first attempt in 2020) as well as retaining their safe seat of Hougang SMC.

Party	Votes	%	+/–	Seats			
Party	Votes	%	+/–	Fielded	Elected	NCMP	+/−
People's Action Party	1,570,803	65.57	+4.35	97	87	0	▲4
Workers' Party	359,161	14.99	+3.77	26	10	2	▲2
Progress Singapore Party	117,005	4.88	−5.30	13	0	0	▼2
Red Dot United	94,955	3.96	+2.71	15	0	0	0
Singapore Democratic Party	89,053	3.72	−0.73	11	0	0	0
People's Alliance for Reform	60,207	2.51	New	13	0	0	New
Singapore Democratic Alliance	29,213	1.22	−0.27	4	0	0	0
Singapore People's Party	28,205	1.18	−0.34	5	0	0	0
Singapore United Party	15,874	0.66	New	5	0	0	New
People's Power Party	15,525	0.65	−0.35	10	0	0	0
Independents	12,537	0.52	+0.49	2	0	0	0
National Solidarity Party	3,127	0.13	−3.62	10	0	0	0
Total	2,395,665	100.00	–	211	97	2	0
Valid votes	2,395,665	98.24					
Invalid/blank votes	42,945	1.76					
Total votes	2,438,610	100.00					
Registered voters/turnout	2,627,026	92.83					
Source: calculation based on https://www.eld.gov.sg/finalresults2025.html

== By-elections ==
By-elections are elections held to fill seats in Parliament that fall vacant in between general elections, known as casual vacancies. In the past, the Government took the position that the prime minister had discretion whether or not a by-election should be called to fill a casual vacancy in an SMC, and could leave a parliamentary seat unfilled until the next general election. However, in the case of Vellama d/o Marie Muthu v. Attorney-General (2013), which arose from a vacancy in Hougang SMC, the Court of Appeal held that the Constitution obliges the prime minister to call a by-election unless a general election is going to be held in the near future. However, a by-election need only be called within a reasonable time, and the prime minister has discretion to determine when it should be held.

The law provides that a by-election need only be called in a GRC if all the MPs in the constituency vacate their seats. It has been argued that the law should be amended, otherwise electors living in a GRC where a vacancy has arisen will lack parliamentary representation, and with a missing MP the remaining MPs may find it difficult to deal with constituency matters. Also, if the MP who vacates their seat is from a minority community and the seat is not filled, this would defeat the purpose of the GRC scheme which is to ensure a minimum level of minority representation in Parliament. In response, the Government has said that the other MPs of the GRC continue to represent the electors and should be able to handle constituency matters without any problems. Moreover, the loss of one minority MP in a GRC should not make much difference in practice as there will be other minority MPs in Parliament.

NCMPs are only declared to be elected at general elections, and there is no provision for the seat of an NCMP to be filled if it falls vacant. On the other hand, if an NMP vacates their seat, a Special Select Committee of Parliament may nominate a replacement to be appointed by the President.

== See also ==
- Constituencies of Singapore
- Elections in Singapore
- Parliament of Singapore
- Presidential elections in Singapore
- List of Singapore opposition party MPs elected
