= Elections in the Republic of Ireland =

In Ireland, direct elections by universal suffrage are used for the President, the ceremonial head of state; for Dáil Éireann, the house of representatives of the Oireachtas or parliament; for the European Parliament; and for local government. All elections use proportional representation by means of the single transferable vote (PR-STV) in constituencies returning three or more members, except that the presidential election and by-elections use the single-winner analogue of STV, elsewhere called instant-runoff voting or the alternative vote. Members of Seanad Éireann, the second house of the Oireachtas, are partly nominated, partly indirectly elected, and partly elected by graduates of particular universities.

Coalition governments have been the norm since 1989. Fine Gael (or its predecessor Cumann na nGaedheal) or Fianna Fáil have led every government since independence in 1922. The current government is a coalition of Fianna Fáil, Fine Gael and Independents. Traditionally, the Labour Party was the third party, although since 2016 it has been surpassed by Sinn Féin. Smaller parties and independents exist in the Dáil and more so in local government.

Since 2023, electoral operations and oversight of electoral integrity have been carried out by an independent Electoral Commission.

== Eligibility to vote ==
Entitlement to vote is based on citizenship. Residents of the state who are Irish citizens or British citizens may vote in elections to Dáil Éireann, the lower house of the Oireachtas (parliament). Residents who are citizens of any EU state may vote in European Parliament elections, while any resident, regardless of citizenship, may vote in local elections.

The right of Irish expatriates to vote is heavily restricted. Only members of the armed forces and diplomatic staff abroad may vote in Dáil elections, while only expatriates who are graduates of the National University of Ireland or Trinity College Dublin may vote in Seanad elections to the university constituencies.

Rights of residents to vote at Irish elections
| Citizenship | Local elections | European elections | Dáil Elections | Presidential elections | Referendums |
|---|---|---|---|---|---|
| Ireland | check | check | check | check | check |
| United Kingdom | check | (Note: British citizens lost the right to vote in European elections after Brexit.) | check | X mark | X mark |
| EU | check | check | X mark | X mark | X mark |
| Other non-EU | check | X mark | X mark | X mark | X mark |

== Early voting ==
Military personnel, whether serving at home or abroad, vote by postal ballot. These votes are delivered by a courier service, usually a commercial one, but a military courier is used for ballots cast by Irish troops in Lebanon and Syria. Voters living on islands off the west coast in counties Galway, Mayo, and Donegal traditionally voted two or three days before polling day, but in 2014 the gap was narrowed, when they voted just one day beforehand. Following an amendment to electoral law in 2022, early voting on the islands is allowed only in exceptional circumstances.

== General elections ==
Under the Constitution, the term of a Dáil is a maximum of seven years; statute law, currently the Electoral Act 1992, establishes a lower maximum of five years. The Taoiseach may advise the president to dissolve at any time. If a Taoiseach has ceased to retain the support of the majority of the Dáil, the president may in their absolute discretion refuse to dissolve the Dáil. To date, no president has refused to dissolve the Dáil.

Electoral law provides that the "same Dáil shall not continue for a longer period than five years from the date of its first meeting". When the Dáil is dissolved, the Clerk of the Dáil must issue a writ of election to the returning officer for each constituency. The election must take place on a date set by the Minister for Housing, Local Government and Heritage 18 to 25 days (disregarding any excluded day) after the writs have been issued.

Elections are by single transferable vote (STV), with each constituency returning between three and five deputies, each called a Teachta Dála or TD. From 1980, constituencies have been redrawn by an independent Constituency Commission after each census, which was put on a statutory basis in 1997. From 2023, these functions have been carried out by the Electoral Commission.

The erection and removal of campaign posters by candidates is governed by the Litter Pollution Act 1997 and the Electoral (Amendment) (No. 2) Act 2009. Posters may only be erected for a certain specified time period before an election. This time period is either (a) 30 days before the poll date or (b) from the date the polling day order for the election has been made, whichever provides the shorter period of time. Posters must be removed within seven days of polling day.

General elections to Dáil Éireann and resulting Irish governments
| Polling | | Date of nominations | Dáil | | | Government | | |
| Date | Day | Date of nominations | No. | Term | Days | No. (Note: See table for the government title corresponding to each abbreviation.) | Head (Note: See table for the title of the head of government.) | Party or parties |
|---|---|---|---|---|---|---|---|---|
| 14 December 1918 (Note: Territorial constituencies only; in those the results were declared on 28 December, to allow time for votes by members of the British Armed Forces to be sent to the returning officers. The university constituencies voted as follows: Dublin University polling 16–20 December, declaration 21 December; National University polling 18–22 December, declaration 23 December and Queen's University of Belfast polling 16–20 December, declaration 20 December,) (Note: The 30th Parliament of the United Kingdom, convened after the December 1910 election, was dissolved on 25 November 1918.) | Sat | 4 Dec | 1st | 21 January 1919 – 10 May 1921 (Note: Last meeting of the First Dáil. A resolution passed at that meeting provided for the First Dáil to be dissolved on the assembling of the Second Dáil.) | 841 | 1st DM/ 2nd DM (Note: De Valera (2nd) replaced Brugha (1st) on 1 April 1919.) | Cathal Brugha/ Éamon de Valera | Sinn Féin |
| 24 May 1921 | Tue | 13 May (Note: Except National University of Ireland, where nominations closed on 14 May 1921) | 2nd | 16 August 1921 – 8 June 1922 (Note: Last meeting of the Second Dáil. A meeting scheduled for 30 Jun 1922 was preempted by the outbreak of the Civil War. The Second Dáil was never formally dissolved and Irish republican legitimists have regarded it as de jure continuing while the Third Dáil was illegitimate.) | 394 | 3rd DM | Éamon de Valera | Sinn Féin |
| 24 May 1921 | Tue | 13 May | 2nd | 16 August 1921 – 8 June 1922 | 394 | 4th DM (Note: De Valera resigned on 7 January 1922 after losing the Anglo-Irish Treaty Dáil vote. Griffith's pro-Treaty ministry was formed on 10 January.) | Arthur Griffith | Sinn Féin (Pro-Treaty) |
| 16 Jun 1922 (Note: The polling days for National University of Ireland were 12–15 June 1922, with the declaration being made on 16 June 1922.) | Fri | 6 Jun (Note: Except Dublin University, where nominations closed on 8 Jun 1922.) | 3rd | 9 September 1922 (Note: Originally to have been 1 July 1922. The Dáil was prorogued on five occasions and eventually met on 9 Sep 1922.) – 9 August 1923 | 335 | 2nd PG/ (Note: The 1st Provisional Government with Michael Collins as chairman was formed on 14 January 1922, without reference to the Second Dáil. Collins was killed on 22 August 1922 and Cosgrave's Provisional Government formed on 30 August, after the June election to the Third Dáil but before its first meeting in September.); 1st EC (Note: On 6 December 1922, the Free State constitution came into force. The provisional government ceased to exit and the first Executive Council was appointed.) | W. T. Cosgrave | Cumann na nGaedheal (Note: Cumann na nGaedheal was founded in early 1923, before which Cosgrave's pro-Treaty government was not affiliated to any party, Sinn Féin having ceased to function.) |
| 27 Aug 1923 | Mon | 18 Aug | 4th | 19 September 1923 – 23 May 1927 | 1343 | 2nd EC | W. T. Cosgrave | Cumann na nGaedheal |
| 9 Jun 1927 | Thu | 1 June | 5th | 23 June 1927 – 25 August 1927 | 64 | 3rd EC | W. T. Cosgrave | Cumann na nGaedheal |
| 15 Sep 1927 | Thu | 3 Sep | 6th | 11 October 1927 – 29 January 1932 | 1572 | 4th EC / 5th EC (Note: On 27 March 1930, the Executive Council resigned. On 2 April, Cosgrave was appointed again as President of the Executive Council and appointed a new Executive Council with the same membership.) | W. T. Cosgrave | Cumann na nGaedheal (Note: A Farmers' Party TD was a parliamentary secretary.) |
| 16 Feb 1932 | Tue | 8 Feb | 7th | 9 March 1932 – 2 January 1933 | 300 | 6th EC | Éamon de Valera | Fianna Fáil |
| 24 Jan 1933 | Tue | | 8th | 11 January 1933 – 14 June 1937 | 1616 | 7th EC | Éamon de Valera | Fianna Fáil |
| 1 Jul 1937 | Thu | | 9th | 21 July 1937 – 27 May 1938 | 311 | 8th EC / 1st GI (Note: The Constitution of Ireland came into force on 29 December 1937, with the former Free State's final executive council and president becoming the first government of Ireland and Taoiseach.) | Éamon de Valera | Fianna Fáil |
| 17 Jun 1938 | Fri | 7 June | 10th | 30 June 1938 – 26 June 1943 (Note: Exceptionally, because of the state of emergency arising from the Second World War, the 10th Dáil was not dissolved until after all the returns to the Clerk of the Dáil from all constituencies of the election.) | 1823 | 2nd GI | Éamon de Valera | Fianna Fáil |
| 23 Jun 1943 | Wed | 9 June | 11th | 1 July 1943 – 7 June 1944 | 343 | 3rd GI | Éamon de Valera | Fianna Fáil |
| 30 May 1944 | Tue | 19 May | 12th | 9 June 1944 – 12 January 1948 | 1313 | 4th GI | Éamon de Valera | Fianna Fáil |
| 4 Feb 1948 | Wed | | 13th | 18 February 1948 – 7 May 1951 | 1175 | 5th GI | John A. Costello | Fine Gael; Labour Party; Clann na Poblachta; Clann na Talmhan; National Labour (Note: National Labour merged back into the Labour Party in 1950.); Independent |
| 30 May 1951 | Wed | 17 May | 14th | 13 June 1951 – 24 April 1954 | 1047 | 6th GI | Éamon de Valera | Fianna Fáil |
| 18 May 1954 | Tue | 4 May | 15th | 2 June 1954 – 12 February 1957 | 987 | 7th GI | John A. Costello | Fine Gael; Labour Party; Clann na Talmhan |
| 5 Mar 1957 | Tue | 21 Feb | 16th | 20 March 1957 – 15 September 1961 | 1641 | 8th/ 9th GI (Note: De Valera's 8th government was succeeded by Lemass's 9th in 1959.) | Éamon de Valera/ Seán Lemass | Fianna Fáil |
| 4 Oct 1961 | Wed | | 17th | 11 October 1961 – 18 March 1965 | 1255 | 10th GI | Seán Lemass | Fianna Fáil |
| 7 Apr 1965 | Wed | | 18th | 21 April 1965 – 22 May 1969 | 1493 | 11th/ 12th GI (Note: Lemass's 11th government was succeeded by Lynch's 12th in 1966.) | Seán Lemass/ Jack Lynch | Fianna Fáil |
| 18 Jun 1969 | Wed | | 19th | 2 July 1969 – 5 February 1973 | 1315 | 13th GI | Jack Lynch | Fianna Fáil |
| 28 Feb 1973 | Wed | | 20th | 14 March 1973 – 25 May 1977 | 1534 | 14th GI | Liam Cosgrave | Fine Gael; Labour Party |
| 16 Jun 1977 | Thu | | 21st | 5 July 1977 – 21 May 1981 | 1417 | 15th/ 16th GI (Note: In 1979 Haughey (16th) succeeded Lynch (15th)) | Jack Lynch/ Charles Haughey | Fianna Fáil |
| 11 Jun 1981 | Thu | | 22nd | 30 June 1981 – 27 January 1982 | 212 | 17th GI | Garret FitzGerald | Fine Gael; Labour Party |
| 18 Feb 1982 | Thu | | 23rd | 9 March 1982 – 4 November 1982 | 241 | 18th GI | Charles Haughey | Fianna Fáil |
| 24 Nov 1982 | Wed | | 24th | 14 December 1982 – 21 January 1987 | 1500 | 19th GI | Garret FitzGerald | Fine Gael; Labour Party (Note: Labour Party left government on 20 January 1987.) |
| 17 Feb 1987 | Tue | | 25th | 10 March 1987 – 25 May 1989 | 808 | 20th GI | Charles Haughey | Fianna Fáil |
| 15 Jun 1989 | Thu | | 26th | 29 June 1989 – 5 November 1992 | 1226 | 21st/ 22nd GI (Note: On 11 February 1992 Reynolds (22nd) succeeded Haughey (21st)) | Charles Haughey/ Albert Reynolds | Fianna Fáil; Progressive Democrats (Note: Progressive Democrats left government on 4 November 1992.) |
| 25 Nov 1992 | Wed | | 27th | 14 December 1992 – 15 May 1997 | 1614 | 23rd GI | Albert Reynolds | Fianna Fáil; Labour Party (Note: Labour Party left government on 15 November 1994.) |
| 25 Nov 1992 | Wed | | 27th | 14 December 1992 – 15 May 1997 | 1614 | 24th GI (Note: On 15 December 1994 the 24th government replaced the 23rd. This has been the only occasion on which there was a change in the government parties without a general election.) | John Bruton | Fine Gael; Labour Party; Democratic Left |
| 6 Jun 1997 | Fri | 26 May | 28th | 26 June 1997 – 25 April 2002 | 1765 | 25th GI | Bertie Ahern | Fianna Fáil; Progressive Democrats |
| 17 May 2002 | Fri | 3 May | 29th | 6 June 2002 – 29 April 2007 | 1789 | 26th GI | Bertie Ahern | Fianna Fáil; Progressive Democrats |
| 24 May 2007 | Thu | 9 May | 30th | 14 June 2007 – 1 February 2011 | 1329 | 27th/ 28th GI (Note: On 7 May 2008 Cowen (28th) replaced Ahern (27th)) | Bertie Ahern/ Brian Cowen | Fianna Fáil; Green Party (Note: Green Party left government on 23 January 2011.); Progressive Democrats (Note: The Progressive Democrats were dissolved in 2009 and their ministers and other TDs sat as independents thereafter.) |
| 25 Feb 2011 | Fri | 9 Feb | 31st | 9 March 2011 – 3 February 2016 | 1793 | 29th GI | Enda Kenny | Fine Gael; Labour Party |
| 26 Feb 2016 | Fri | 11 Feb | 32nd | 10 March 2016 – 14 January 2020 | 1406 | 30th/ 31st GI (Note: On 14 Jun 2017 Varadkar (31st) succeeded Kenny (30th).) | Enda Kenny/ Leo Varadkar | Fine Gael; Independent |
| 8 Feb 2020 | Sat | 22 Jan | 33rd | 20 February 2020 to 8 November 2024 | 1724 | 32nd/33rd GI/34th GI (Note: On 17 December 2022 Varadkar (32nd) succeeded Martin (33rd). On 9 April 2024, Harris (34th) succeeded Varadkar) | Micheál Martin/ Leo Varadkar/ Simon Harris | Fianna Fáil; Fine Gael; Green Party |
| 29 Nov 2024 | Fri | 18 Nov | 34th | 18 December 2024 | 664 | 35th GI | Micheál Martin | Fianna Fáil; Fine Gael (Note: Five Independent are ministers of state.); Independent |

Footnotes

Titles of the government and its head
| Dates | Abbr | Title of government | Head of government |
|---|---|---|---|
| 1919–22 | DM | Dáil Ministry | President of Dáil Éireann |
| 1922 | PG | Provisional Government | Chairman of the Provisional Government |
| 1922–37 | EC | Executive Council of the Irish Free State | President of the Executive Council |
| 1937– | GI | Government of Ireland | Taoiseach |

== Seanad elections ==
Elections to Seanad Éireann take place after the general election to the Dáil. There are sixty members of the Seanad. Of these, eleven are nominated by the Taoiseach appointed next after the dissolution of the Dáil. Six are elected by STV in university constituencies: three for the National University (by graduates) and three for Dublin University (by graduates and scholars of Trinity College Dublin). Forty-three are elected by an electorate of serving politicians (members of the incoming Dáil, the outgoing Seanad, and city and county councillors) for five vocational panels. These elections are also counted using STV, although using a different set of rules on the distribution of surpluses and the order of counts than in other elections in Ireland.

== European elections ==
Elections to the European Parliament are held simultaneously across Europe every five years. In Ireland, as for Dáil elections, STV is used in constituencies returning three to five members. Ireland has 14 seats in the European Parliament.

== Local elections ==
Elections to county councils, city councils and city and county councils are held every five years and by convention take place on the same day as European elections. Local electoral areas (LEAs) return between three and seven councillors by STV. Until the Local Government Reform Act 2014, elections were also held for borough and town councils. The 2014 Act abolished borough and town councils with their functions transferred to municipal districts of the county councils, comprising the county councillors from the LEA coterminous with the district.

Some members of Údarás na Gaeltachta were directly elected by Gaeltacht residents between 1980 and 2012; since then all have been appointed by the government.

== Presidential elections ==
The President of Ireland is formally elected by the citizens of Ireland once in every seven years, except in the event of premature vacancy, when an election must be held within sixty days. The President is directly elected by secret ballot under the system of the instant-runoff voting (although the Constitution describes it as "the system of proportional representation by means of the single transferable vote"). While both Irish and British citizens resident in the state may vote in Dáil elections, only Irish citizens, who must be at least 18 years of age, may vote in the election of the President. The presidency is open to all citizens of the state who are at least 35. A candidate must be nominated by one of the following:

- Twenty members of the Oireachtas (Dáil or Seanad).
- Four local authorities.
- Themselves (in the case of an incumbent or former president who has served only one term).

Where only one candidate is nominated, that candidate is declared elected without a ballot. No one may serve as President for more than two terms.

== Referendums ==
The Constitution of Ireland was approved by plebiscite on 1 July 1937. The Constitution recognises two types of referendums:

- On a proposed amendment to the Constitution, for which a referendum is always required, and the amendment is passed by a majority of those voting;
- An ordinary referendum, on a bill other than an amendment to the Constitution, for which a referendum is only required on petition of Oireachtas members, and the bill is passed by a majority of those eligible to vote.

There have been 38 referendums for amendments to the Constitution of Ireland. There have been no ordinary referendums. A 1995 Supreme Court judgment prohibits the government from using public money to fund campaigns in favour of one side in a referendum. Since 1998, independent commissions (since 2023 the Electoral Commission, previously Referendum Commissions) provide neutral information to the public on each amendment. An organisation can register with the commission as an "approved body" in order to campaign publicly for or against the proposal, and to have monitors in polling stations and counting agents at count centres.

For a proposal to change the name of a place, a plebiscite is required. The most recent (1956) Regulations on conducting such plebiscites relate to a postal vote of ratepayers; in 2019 the relevant electorate was changed from ratepayers to local electors, but as of 28 September 2026 the regulations have not been updated accordingly. In a County Cork town, Charleville was chosen in a 1989 four-option plebiscite ahead of Ráth Luirc, An Rath, and Rathgoggan. The Official Languages Act 2003 prevented the plebiscite provision applying to places in the Gaeltacht, and so a 2005 plebiscite to change the name of Dingle, County Kerry was ruled invalid; in 2011, the 2003 Act was amended to remove the Gaeltacht restriction.

Other local plebiscites include three in 2019 on whether to establish directly-elected mayors for Cork City Council, Limerick City and County Council and Waterford City and County Council, of which only that for Limerick was passed.

== See also ==
- Voting system
- Dáil vote for Taoiseach
- Politics of the Republic of Ireland
- Elections in Northern Ireland
