= Election agent =

Profession

An election agent is the person legally responsible for the conduct of a candidate's political campaign and to whom election material is sent by those running the election. The term is most used in elections in the United Kingdom, as well as some other similar political systems such as elections in India.

== Responsibilities ==
Election agents are responsible for sanctioning all expenditure on the candidate's campaign, for maintaining the accuracy of and submitting to the returning officer the candidate's expenses and other documents, as well as deciding whether to contest the result of a count.

Agents are also permitted to oversee the casting and counting of votes to ensure the accuracy and impartiality of the election, and may appoint polling and counting agents to assist them in those tasks. The number of polling and counting agents that can be appointed is determined by the returning officer of the election and they must be appointed by a set date laid out in the timetable of the election.

Agents must usually have reached the age of majority and not be acting as a clerk or officer to the returning officer in the given election. If a candidate does not nominate an agent, they are their own agent.

== Around the world ==
In the United Kingdom, candidates may be their own election agent. The Electoral Commission provides periodic guidance for candidates and agents.

In Canada and most of its provinces, an election agent is legally referred to as an official agent.

The larger parties typically pay their election agents, and the role is gradually becoming a professional one, like the similar but not identical role of campaign manager in the United States.

== See also ==
- Teller (elections)
- Polling agent
- Counting agent
- Campaign manager
- List of UK parliamentary election petitions
