= Teller (elections) =

Person who counts the votes in an election, vote, referendum or poll

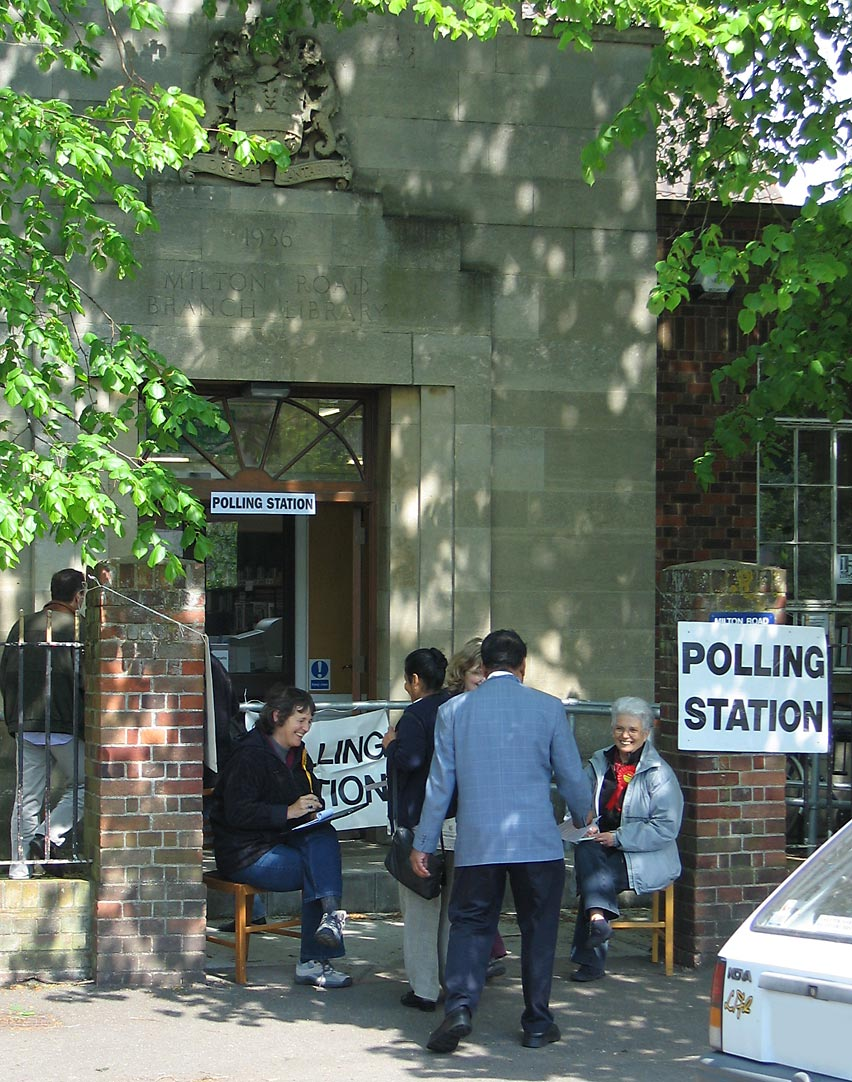
In the United Kingdom, unofficial tellers sit outside polling stations to identify voters

A teller is a person who counts votes in an election, vote, referendum, or poll. Tellers are also known as scrutineers, poll-watchers, challengers or checkers.

They should be distinguished from polling agents and counting agents who officially represent candidates.

== United Kingdom ==
In the United Kingdom, tellers work on behalf of political parties (usually as volunteers). They stand or sit outside the polling station and collect electoral registration numbers (poll numbers) of voters as they enter or leave. They play no official part in the election and voters are under no obligation to speak with them. They are not polling agents, so they have no official rights, such as to enter the polling station. If asked, the tellers must explain they are not officials and why they are collecting poll numbers.

Tellers help their parties identify supporters who have not yet voted, so that they can be contacted and encouraged to vote, and offered assistance—such as transport to the polling station—if necessary. In as far as this increases turn-out, it may be said to be "good" for the democratic process, since a higher voter turnout is generally a stated objective.

Police officers may intervene if tellers "irritate voters, exert undue influence or obstruct the polling station."

Sometimes, some or all of the main parties might reach an agreement to take shifts, and pass on their lists to the other parties; however it is commonplace to see several tellers outside a polling station.

After the May 2005 Northern Ireland elections, the Electoral Commission concluded that some candidates' polling agents unlawfully assisted with identifying supporters who had not yet voted, by passing information from inside the polling place to other party workers. This information is not normally available to parties unless voters give it voluntarily to tellers.

== Other assemblies ==
In other deliberative assemblies, such as voluntary associations, elections and other matters of importance are frequently voted on by ballot. Tellers are appointed to count those ballots. Normally, the chairman appoints the tellers unless the organization's rules provide that tellers are appointed another way, such as appointment of an elections committee. The tellers are chosen for their accuracy and dependability, are not directly involved on what is being voted in, and usually are allowed to vote themselves.

== See also ==
- Ballot
- Ballot box
- Electoral Count Act § Counting procedures
- Electoral fraud
- Secret ballot
- Voting
