= Counting agent =

Overseer of the counting of votes during an election

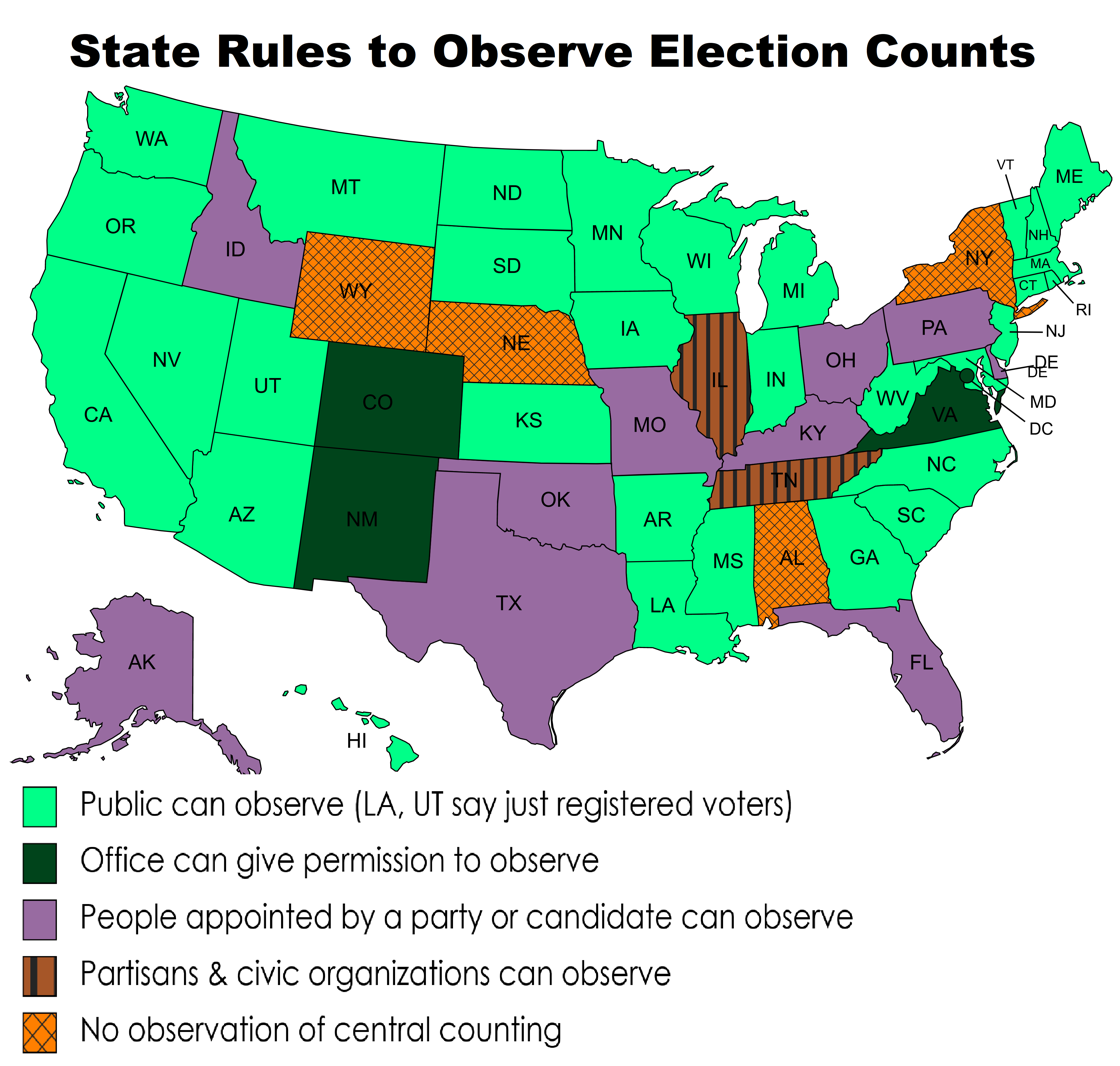
Election observers

A counting agent or count agent is a type of electoral observer and may be self-nominated, appointed by either the candidate standing for election or the candidate's election agent to oversee the counting at the election count.

In the United Kingdom there is no legal requirement to appoint a counting agent. At elections in the Republic of Ireland, counting agents are called tallymen; they keep track not only of first-preference votes but also of transfers.

The number of counting agents which can be appointed is determined by the returning officer of the election and is usually dependent on the number of counting clerks at the count. Counting agents are appointed after the period when nominations to the election are made. The election timetable will state when counting agents have to be appointed, typically a week before polling day.

The role of the counting agent is to oversee the count itself, though they may not touch any of the ballot papers and must act through the returning officer.

UK counting agents must follow a code of practice.

In the United States, absentee ballots are usually counted at a central location, not the polling place. Rules on who may observe the counting vary by state.

== See also ==
- Teller (elections)
- Polling agent
- Representation of the People Act
