= Polling agent =

Political appointee overseeing a poll

A polling agent may attach their own seal to the ballot box, alongside the official seal

In elections in the United Kingdom, Singapore and Malaysia, a polling agent is someone appointed by either the election agent of a candidate standing for election, or where there is no election agent the candidate personally, to oversee conduct of the poll at polling stations, from the installation of empty ballot boxes, through the day as voters cast their ballots, until the ballot boxes are sealed and collected for delivery to the count centre. The primary purpose of a polling agent is to assist in detection of personation.

The appointment of a polling agent is not legally required. Polling agents are appointed after the period when nominations to the election are made. The election timetable states when counting agents have to be appointed, usually about a week before the polling day.

Only one polling agent per candidate may be admitted at any one time to a polling station, and they may not take information out of the polling station.

After the May 2005 Northern Ireland elections, the Electoral Commission concluded that some polling agents unlawfully acted as tellers, identifying those who had not yet voted, and passing information from inside the polling place to other party workers. This information is not normally available to parties unless voters give it voluntarily to tellers, outside the polling place.

== See also ==
- Counting agent
