= CHIJ Saint Nicholas Girls' School =

CHIJ St. Nicholas Girls' School
- 圣尼各拉女校; Sekolah Perempuan St. Nicholas

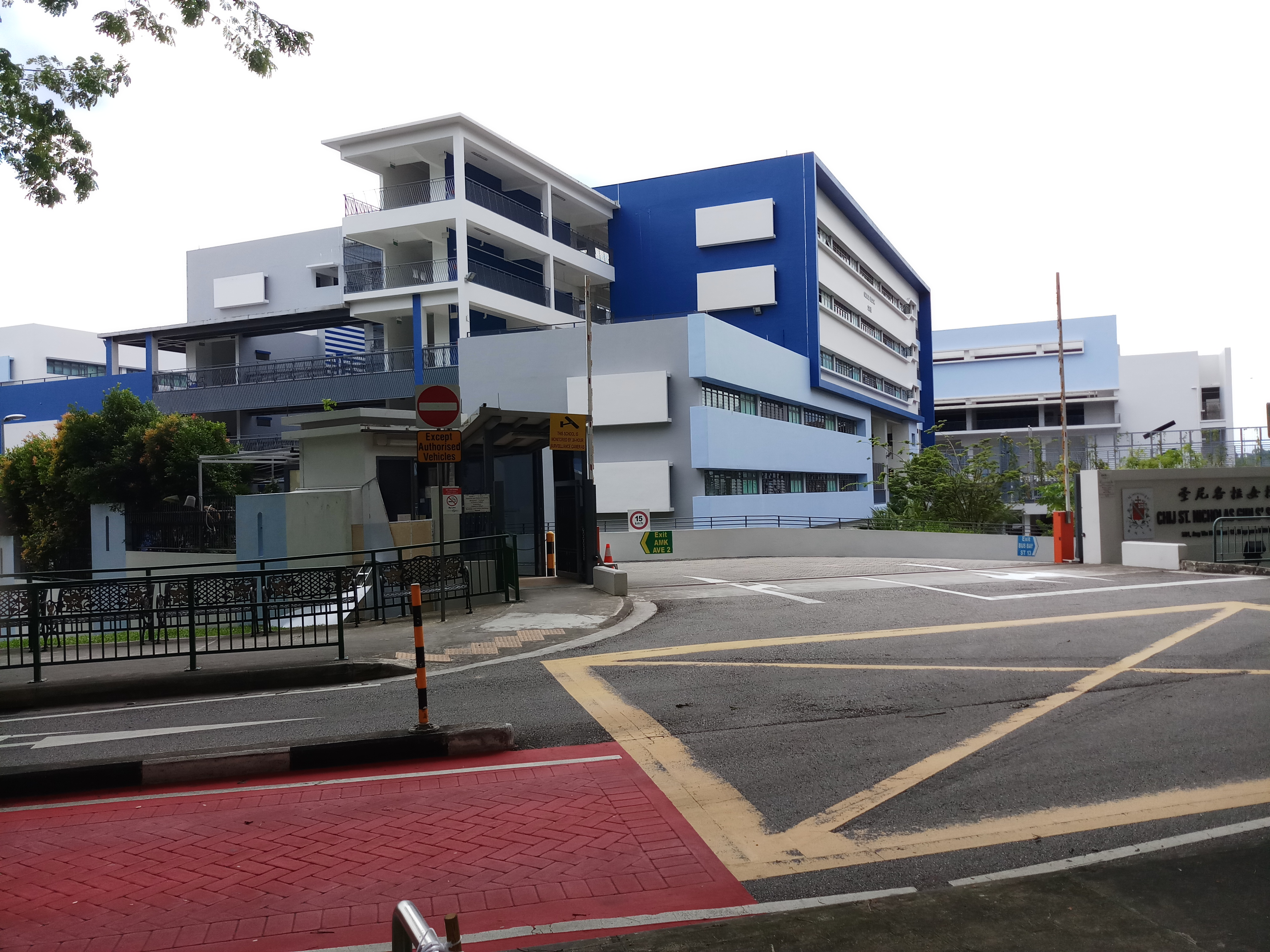

Location
- 501 Ang Mo Kio Street 13; Ang Mo Kio; Singapore; 1.3737°N 103.8343°E

Information
- Type: Government-aided; Autonomous; Special Assistance Plan
- Motto: 德纯义坚 (Simple in virtue, steadfast in duty)
- Established: 16 January 1933
- Session: Single session
- School code: 7118
- Principal: Winnie Tan
- Gender: Female
- Enrolment: Approx. 3,000
- Colour: Blue White
- Affiliations: Catholic Junior College Eunoia Junior College
- Website: www.chijstnicholasgirls.moe.edu.sg

CHIJ St. Nicholas Girls' School (SNGS) is a government-aided autonomous Catholic girls' school in Ang Mo Kio, Singapore. The school is one of 11 Convent of the Holy Infant Jesus (CHIJ) schools in Singapore and one of the designated Special Assistance Plan (SAP) schools. It offers a six-year primary education in its primary school section and a four-year secondary education in its secondary school section.

The school's secondary section offers both a four-year GCE O-Level track (OP) and six-year Integrated Programme (IP) track. Since 2013, it has partnered with Eunoia Junior College for a six-year Integrated Programme, which allows its secondary Integrated Programme students to skip the Singapore-Cambridge GCE Ordinary Level examinations and proceed to Eunoia for Years 5 and 6 and take the Singapore-Cambridge GCE Advanced Level examinations at the end of Year 6.

== History ==
=== Early history ===
St. Nicholas Girls' School was established by the Sisters of the Infant Jesus near the Town Convent at Victoria Street on 16 January 1933 as a Chinese-medium primary school for girls. The school began with an enrolment of 40 pupils in two classes, Primary One and Primary Two. At that time the entire teaching staff consisted of only two people, the principal who taught English, and another teacher who served as a Chinese instructor. At that time, the principal, Sister Francoise Lee, felt the need to cater to Chinese Catholic girls. She pushed for the expansion of the Town Convent to include a Chinese school. That school was built on the former building complex of Hotel van Wijk, run by missionaries to provide education for daughters of Chinese-speaking families, including disadvantaged families and wealthy Chinese merchants alike. The decision to purchase Hotel van Wijk was in part a preventive measure against moral corruption. The former building complex was a hotbed for prostitution activities, thus the purchase would indirectly reduce such influence on the girls living in the convent. Sister Francoise Lee led a fund raising to make the purchase possible. However, the English section of the convent occupied the new building, while the Chinese section was relocated to the old buildings, citing reasons of a larger English population needing more space. In 1941, the school expanded into a full school.

=== World War II ===
During World War II, the convent complex became a refuge for many, serving as an air raid shelter to safeguard the orphans, the sisters and some Carmelite nuns and the charges of the Good Shepherd Sisters. Many unfortunates, such as the poor, sick and handicapped were also sent to the convent to be cared for. One of the school's buildings eventually became a shelter for as many as they could house. During the Japanese occupation of Singapore, it was known as Victoria Street Girls' School until 1945. During this period, the Japanese paid for the wages of the sisters and were responsible for necessities in the convent. The European nuns had to wear armbands to show they were not British, and were required to learn Japanese and to teach a Japanese curriculum. The Japanese did, however, treat the sisters with civility, and those living on the complex were allowed to do so in relative peace during the occupation, as long as they complied with the Japanese governmental system. Despite this, the convent experienced a decline in students, having no more than 200 students. In 1964, the school was separated into primary and secondary sections.

=== Attainment of SAP Status ===
St. Nicholas Girls' School faced an enrolment crisis in the late 1960s to the 1970s as the government was emphasising English as the main medium of instruction over Chinese, and thus many parents were pulling away from St. Nicholas Girls' School when they realised it was a Chinese-medium school. Lee Poh See, the second principal of the school, played an integral role in rebranding the school as a bilingual institution in the late 1960s to the early 1970s, purchasing English textbooks en masse to supplement the then-dominantly Chinese education of the students. This was done in an effort to appeal to parents who were seeking English-medium schools, whilst still retaining its Chinese roots. This move paid dividends in 1979 when St. Nicholas Girls' School received Special Assistance Plan (SAP) status under the new long-term government initiative to preserve the best Chinese-stream schools as bilingual schools. Under this scheme, the school offers both English and Chinese as first languages to Special Stream students. The already strong bilingual culture of the school thus allowed it to adapt seamlessly to the SAP scheme, bringing it out of its precarious situation and giving it a new shot at prominence. In the same year, a pre-primary section was established.

=== Relocation to Toa Payoh ===
By 1980, the Victoria Street premises could no longer hold the whole school and some classes had to move out. They were temporarily held at the former Tao Nan School building at Armenian Street and the former Raffles Girls' Primary School at Queen Street.

In 1982, St. Nicholas Girls' School was provisionally relocated to Toa Payoh. It moved to its current campus in Ang Mo Kio in 1985 when the site was completed. During this time, another school, CHIJ Secondary (Toa Payoh), was set up and officially opened on 17 August 1985. CHIJ Secondary (Toa Payoh) is still in operation at the Toa Payoh campus.

== New campus in Ang Mo Kio ==
On 23 August 1986, the new campus for St. Nicholas Girls' School at Ang Mo Kio Street 13 was declared open by Education Minister Tony Tan.

=== Renaming as CHIJ St. Nicholas Girls' School ===
In 1992, St. Nicholas Girls' School was renamed CHIJ St. Nicholas Girls' School. The school was granted autonomous status by the Ministry of Education in 1995 for recognition in value-added academic performances.

In January 2010, the primary school section was temporarily relocated to the former Kebun Baru Primary School site at 6 Ang Mo Kio Avenue 2, and the secondary school section moved to the former First Toa Payoh Secondary School site at 430 Lorong 1 Toa Payoh, while waiting for completion of the school's renovation under the PRIME programme. In 2013, CHIJ St Nicholas Girls' School finished its rebuilding and was declared open by Prime Minister Lee Hsien Loong.

In 2012, students from CHIJ St Nicholas Girls' School topped the Singapore-Cambridge GCE Ordinary Level examinations for the fourth consecutive year.

In 2013, CHIJ St Nicholas Girls' School introduced the six-year Integrated Programme in collaboration with Catholic High School and Singapore Chinese Girls' School. Under this programme, students from the three schools will complete Years 1 to 4 in their respective schools, and then move on to Eunoia Junior College in Years 5 and 6 and take the Singapore-Cambridge GCE Advanced Level examinations at the end of Year 6.

In 2018, CHIJ St Nicholas Girls' School introduced the return of a popular canteen stall from the old convent. It made news in The Straits Times for the nostalgia invoked in the alumni.

== Academic information ==
=== CHS-SNGS-SCGS Joint Integrated Programme ===
CHIJ St. Nicholas Girls’ School jointly offers the Integrated Programme in collaboration with Catholic High School, Singapore Chinese Girls’ School and Eunoia Junior College from 2013. Under the programme, students skip the Singapore-Cambridge GCE Ordinary Level examinations in their respective schools, and move to Eunoia Junior College for pre-university education in Years 5 and 6 and sit for the Singapore-Cambridge GCE Advanced Level examinations at the end of Year 6.

As CHIJ St. Nicholas Girls' School remains a dual-track school, a four-year Secondary Special/Express course leading to the Singapore-Cambridge GCE Ordinary Level examinations is offered alongside the Integrated Programme.

== Notable alumni ==
- Tan Su Shan, CEO of DBS Bank
- Sharon Au, former Mediacorp actress
- Michelle Chong, actress, director and producer
- Tanya Chua, Mandopop singer-songwriter
- He Ting Ru, Member of Parliament for Sengkang GRC
- Cheryl Koh, pastry chef
- Koh Juat Jong, former Solicitor-General of Singapore
- Rebecca Lim, Mediacorp actress
- Ng Xuan Hui, former national sailor
- Hazel Poa, Non-Constituency Member of Parliament
- Diana Ser, journalist, news presenter and actress
- Sun Xueling, Member of Parliament for Punggol GRC
- Lynn Tan, Miss Universe Singapore 2012
- Samantha Yeo, national swimmer
