= Parthasarathi Mukherjee =

Indian banker

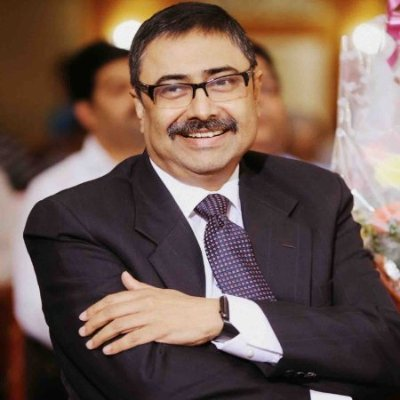
- Born: 7 May 1960 (age 65); Jalandhar, Punjab, India
- Occupation(s): former MD & CEO, Lakshmi Vilas Bank
- Spouse: Papila Mukherjee (deceased)
- Children: Priyadarshini Mukherjee

Parthasarathi Mukherjee is an Indian banker and the former MD & CEO of Lakshmi Vilas Bank.

== Early life ==
Born to an army officer and a housewife in Jalandhar, Punjab, he grew up in Kolkata, West Bengal where he completed his schooling from La Martiniere and went on to receive his bachelor's degree in chemistry from the Presidency College, University of Calcutta in 1979.

== Career ==
He joined State Bank of India as a Probationary Officer in 1982. He was among the first few people who joined and built Axis Bank (then UTI Bank Ltd). In December 2015, he chose to quit his position at Axis Bank and decided to take the plunge to be the top gun in a smaller establishment as the MD & CEO of Lakshmi Vilas Bank

== Personal life ==
Mukherjee was married to Papila, and the couple had a daughter Priyadarshini (born 1989). Papila died in 2014. In his free time, Mukherjee likes to read, listen to music and catch up on the latest news in technology.
