= Tan Su Shan =

Singaporean banker (born 1968)

- Citizenship: Singapore
- Education: CHIJ Saint Nicholas Girls' School; University of Oxford
- Occupation: Chief Executive Officer
- Employer: DBS Bank
- Term: March 2025 -
- Predecessor: Piyush Gupta
- Board member of: Weybourne Holdings Singapore Economic Development Board Climate Impact X Pte Ltd
- Spouse: Christopher Wilson

Tan Su Shan (born 1968) is a Singaporean banker who is the current chief executive officer (CEO) of DBS Bank.

== Education ==
Tan graduated from CHIJ St Nicholas Girls' School. She went to University of Oxford after her GCE-A level where she studied politics, philosophy and economics and graduated with a Master of Arts in 1989 from Lincoln College, Oxford University. Her first internship as a university student was with DBS. She has also completed executive leadership courses in Harvard Business School, Stanford Business School, and Singularity University.

== Career ==
Tan began her career at ING Baring Securities in institutional equity and derivative sales, working in London, Tokyo, and Hong Kong. She joined Morgan Stanley (MS.N) in 1997 as an executive director before becoming Citigroup's regional head for Brunei, Malaysia and Singapore in 2005.

She then returned to Morgan Stanley in 2008 as head of private wealth management for Southeast Asia.

Tan joined DBS in 2010, where she spent the first three years building the bank's wealth management business, later taking over as CEO of DBS after then CEO Mr Piyush Gupta retired in March 2025, becoming the first female CEO of the bank.

== Politics ==
Tan was appointed as a Nominated Member of Parliament from 2012 to 2014, representing Business and Industry.

== Chairmanships and board memberships ==
Tan sits on the advisory board of Dyson's family office, Weybourne Holdings, as well as on the boards of the Singapore Economic Development Board and Climate Impact X Pte Ltd.

She was previously on the board of the Central Provident Fund of Singapore (CPF Board), MPACT Management Ltd. (the Manager of Mapletree Pan Asia Commercial Trust), EvolutionX Debt Capital Pte. Ltd. (a fund focused on growth debt, founded jointly by Temasek and DBS), and The Singhealth Fund Limited,

== Awards and recognition ==
In 2025 and 2026, Tan was ranked 6th globally in Fortune's Most Powerful Women in Business list.

In 2025, she was ranked the most powerful women in Asia, and 28th on Fortune's inaugural "100 Most Powerful People in Business" list for 2025.

In 2024, she was also featured on Forbes Asia's Power Businesswomen List.

In 2018, she was named as part of the Forbes Emergent 25 list.

In 2015, she was named the world's Best Leader in Private Banking at the prestigious PWM/The Banker Global Private Banking Awards in Geneva, the first Singaporean to do so.

== Personal life ==
Tan is married to Christopher Wilson, with two children, Talisa and Kai.
