= Lai Yee Hing =

Singaporean chemist

- 賴怡興
- Professor Lai at the Jurong Bird Park
- Born: Singapore
- Education: Nanyang University (BSc), University of Victoria (PhD), University of California Berkeley (post-doctoral fellow)
- Occupation: organic chemistry professor
- Employer: National University of Singapore
- Known for: novel aromatic compounds, conjugated organic materials and macrocycles

Lai Yee Hing (Chinese: 賴怡興; pinyin: Lài Yíxìng) is a Singaporean organic chemistry professor based in the National University of Singapore. He was the principal of NUS High School of Mathematics and Science and held this position from July 2004 to 30 August 2007.

Lai Yee Hing graduated with a BSc from the former Nanyang University (now National University of Singapore) in 1976 and received his PhD from the University of Victoria in 1980. Following that he spent 2 years in University of California Berkeley as a post-doctoral fellow, working with Peter Vollhardt. His research interests include novel aromatic compounds, conjugated organic materials and macrocycles.
