= Ng Ser Miang =

Singaporean entrepreneur, diplomat, and retired sailor

Ng Ser Miang BBM PJG
- 黄思绵
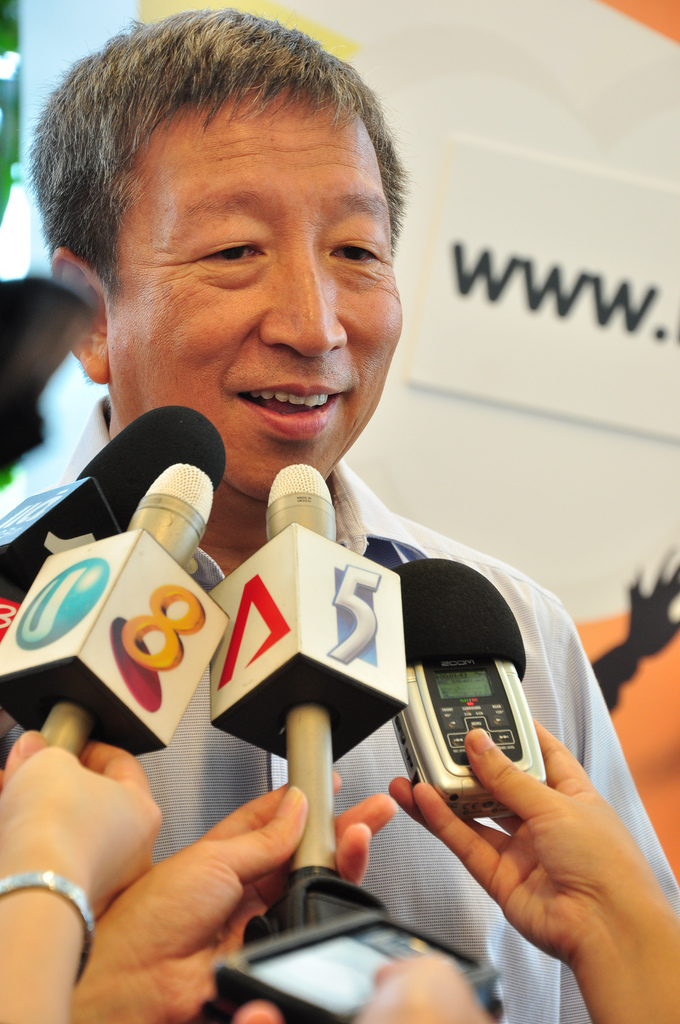
- Ng in 2009

Vice-President of the International Olympic Committee
- In office 2020–2024
- President: Thomas Bach
- In office 2009–2013
- President: Jacques Rogge

Singaporean non-resident Ambassador to Norway
- In office 2001 – 25 April 2019
- Prime Minister: Goh Chok Tong; Lee Hsien Loong
- Succeeded by: Tan Wah Yeow

Singaporean non-resident Ambassador to Hungary
- In office 2000–2013
- Prime Minister: Goh Chok Tong; Lee Hsien Loong
- Succeeded by: Ng Shin Ein

President of the Singapore Organising Committee for the 2010 Summer Youth Olympic Games
- In office 2007–2010
- Preceded by: Position established
- Succeeded by: Position abolished

Personal details
- Born: Ng Ser Miang; 6 April 1949 (age 77) Swatow, China
- Citizenship: Singapore
- Children: 3
- Education: University of Singapore (now the National University of Singapore)

Ng Ser Miang (Note: Chinese: 黄思绵; Pe̍h-ūe-jī: N̂g Sṳ-miâng; pinyin: Huáng Sīmián) (born 6 April 1949) is a Singaporean entrepreneur, diplomat, retired sailor, and sports administrator. He founded Trans-Island Bus Services (now known as SMRT Buses) in 1982 and is a board member of Singapore Press Holdings. Ng has been the vice-president of the Singapore National Olympic Council since 1990, and served as the president of the 2010 Summer Youth Olympics organising committee. From 2009 to 2013, and again from 2020 to 2024, he served as a vice-president of the International Olympic Committee. In 2013, he was a candidate for the presidency of the International Olympic Committee, but lost to Thomas Bach. Domestically, Ng was a Nominated Member of Parliament (NMP) from 2002 to 2005, and served Singapore as the Ambassador to Norway and Hungary under prime ministers Goh Chok Tong and Lee Hsien Loong.

== Early life ==
Ng was born in 1949 in Swatow, China; his family moved to Singapore the same year, right before the proclamation of the People's Republic of China. He studied at the Serangoon Garden Government High School (now Serangoon Garden Secondary School and Dunman Government High School (now Dunman High School). While in high school, Ng was a Boy Scout troop leader and head prefect. During this time he also travelled to the United States for nine months with an American Field Service scholarship. While in the country, Ng developed an interest in sailing and learned the sport.

After high school, Ng studied business administration at the University of Singapore (now the National University of Singapore) and graduated in 1971 with honours. While at university, in 1969, Ng won a silver medal at the Southeast Asian Peninsular Games as a part of the Singapore sailing team. Following his graduation, he completed his national service.

== Career ==
In 1973, Ng entered the business world, working as a bank officer at the Chung Khiaw Bank. Three years later, he became the managing director of Singapore Shuttle Bus, a City Shuttle Service operator. To create competition for Singapore Bus Service, the only bus service in Singapore at the time, Ng started the Trans-Island Bus Services (TIBS) in 1982 and acted as the company's managing director. As a result of his work with TIBS and Singapore Shuttle Bus, Ng was named Singapore's Outstanding Manager of the Year in 1993. In 2001, TIBS was purchased by SMRT Corporation and later rebranded SMRT Buses. Ng retired from the company after overseeing the sale.

In 2005, Ng took over as non-executive chairman of NTUC FairPrice, Singapore's largest supermarket chain, which is known for its philanthropy work within Singapore. In addition to these roles, Ng has been a board member of Singapore Press Holdings since 2007 and of WBL Corporation from 2005 to 2012.

Throughout his career, Ng has held a number of leadership and advisory roles in Singapore's business community. He served as president of the Automobile Association of Singapore from 1988 to 1996. In 1992, he became a faculty fellow of Business Administration in the School of Postgraduate Management Studies at the National University of Singapore. The next year, he became a member of the Trade Development Board of the China Business Information Advisory Group as well as a member of the Advisory Board of the Entrepreneurship Development Center at Nanyang Technological University.

== Sports administration ==
Through his interest in sailing, Ng became involved with several sailing and sports councils, including acting as president of the Singapore Yachting Association in the early 1990s and later being elected as vice-president of the International Sailing Federation in 1994, a role he held for four years.

From 1991 to 2002, he was chairman of the Singapore Sports Council (SSC). While serving as the SSC chairman, Ng helped launch the Sports for Life programme to promote sports for Singaporeans of all ages, and the Sports Excellence programme which directed national resources to supporting athletes in competitive sports. During Ng's tenure, the Singaporean government spent Singapore $500 million in supporting the different programmes.

Ng's involvement with the Olympic Movement began with roles in the local Olympic council. He was elected as vice-president of the Singapore National Olympic Council in 1990. In 1993, Ng became chairman of the Singapore Olympic Academy. He initiated and acted as chairman of Project 0812, an organisation that provided Singaporean athletes with high-level training and preparation to win medals in the Beijing and London Olympics. Through his efforts with Project 0812, Singapore received its first Olympic medal in 48 years at the 2008 Beijing Olympic Games.

In 2005, after being the first Asian elected to the International Olympic Committee Executive Board, Ng served as president of the 117th IOC Session Organising Committee which took place in Singapore. He has also held a seat on the IOC audit and finance commissions, and was on the Coordination Commissions for the 2008 Beijing and the 2012 London Olympics.

In 2009, Ng was elected a vice-president of the IOC, a position to which he was re-elected to in 2020. In 2013, Ng also served as chairman of the inaugural Asian Youth Games Steering Committee. In 2010, Ng served chairman of the inaugural Singapore Youth Olympic Games Organising Committee. Two years later, he helped organise the Singapore Youth Olympic Festival, an annual event that exposes youth to the Olympic spirit. He also currently serves as chairman of the Singapore Olympic Foundation. Ng declared his candidacy to become the next president of the International Olympic Committee in May 2013 at the Sorbonne in Paris.

In 2014, Ng was named president of the Fundación Valencia CF.

In 2025, Ng was accused of a conflict of interest in relation to his role as chair of the IOC's Olympic Esports Commission and his involvement with family-owned businesses in the esports sector. The IOC rejected these claims.

== Public service ==
In 1995, Ng and other former members of The Singapore Scout Association formed the Singapore Scout Guild. The organisation was established to serve as role models to current scouts and to demonstrate that former scouts go on to lead successful lives.

From its inception in 2001, Ng became chairman of Network China, an organisation created to assist companies in Singapore to network and find business opportunities in China. Also beginning in 2001, Ng served on the Asia Pacific Economic Cooperation Business Advisory Council. He held this position until 2008.

Ng has represented Singapore as a non-resident Ambassador to Norway from 2001 to 2019, and was also a non-resident Ambassador to Hungary from 2000 to 2013. He has served as a Justice of the Peace in Singapore since 2005. Previously, he served as a Nominated Member of Parliament from 2002 to 2005 in the 10th Parliament of Singapore.

== Awards and recognition ==
In 1993, Ng was named Singapore's Outstanding Manager of the Year for his work with the Trans-Island Bus Service. In 2012 he was awarded the Order of Merit of the Republic of Hungary after his time as Singapore's non-resident Ambassador to Hungary. He has also received a Distinguished Service Award from the United States Sports Academy. From the IOC Ng has received the Centennial Olympic Games Trophy in 1996 and the Sports and the Community Trophy in 2006. The Singaporean government awarded Ng with the Public Service Star in 1999 and the Meritorious Service Medal in 2005. Ng was awarded the Meritorious Service Medal by the Singapore Government in 2010, and was inducted into the Singapore Sport Hall of Fame in 2024.

== Personal life ==
Ng has two daughters and a son with late wife Ko Ai Choo. Elder daughter Xuan Hui is a former national sailor, three-time Singapore National Olympic Council Sportsgirl of the Year, and gold medalist at the 1991 and 1993 Southeast Asian Games.

== Notes ==
Sporting positions
| New creation | President of Organizing Committee for Summer Youth Olympic Games; 2010 | Succeeded by (China) Li Xueyong |
