= Susan Lim =

Singaporean surgeon

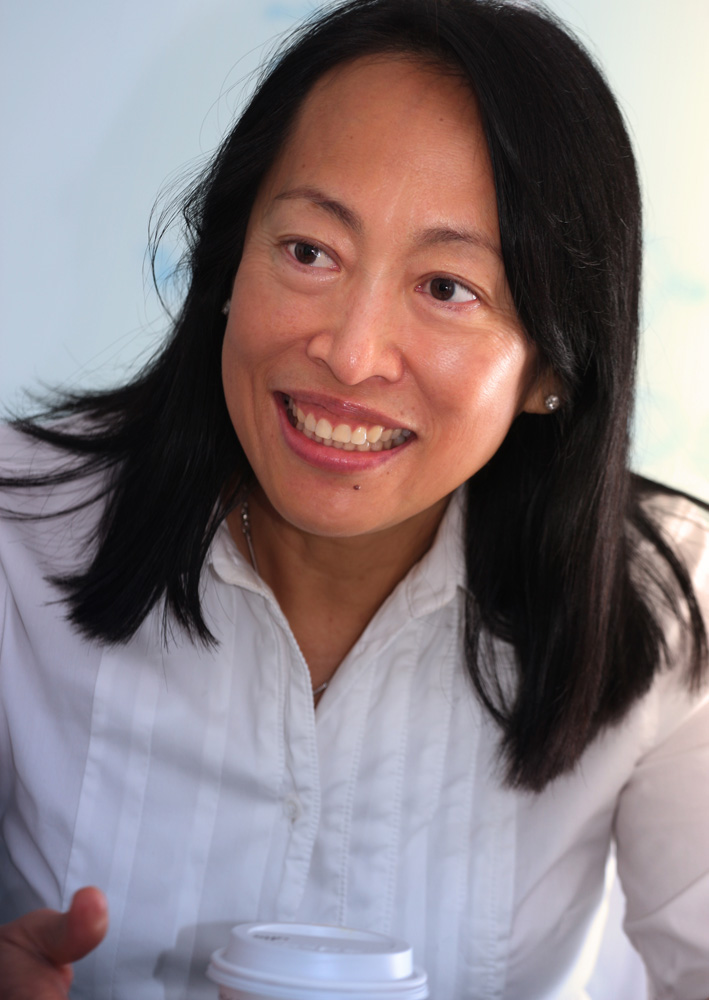
- Education: FRCS; FRCS (Glasg); M.Med Surg (S'pore); Hon MD (NewC); FACS; FAMS
- Alma mater: Monash University; University of Cambridge
- Occupations: Surgeon scientist entrepreneur
- Website: drsusanlim.com

Susan Lim Mey Lee is a Singaporean surgeon who in 1990 performed the first successful liver transplant in Singapore.

== Early life ==
Susan Lim was born in Singapore and was educated at Singapore Chinese Girls' School and the Raffles Institution. In 1974 she was awarded a scholarship under the Colombo Plan to study medicine at Monash University in Australia. From 1977, during her studies, she was resident at Trinity College attached to the University of Melbourne.

She graduated from Monash University (MBBS (Hons) 1979).

== Academic career ==
In 1984, she became a Fellow of the Royal College of Surgeons of Edinburgh, and she received a gold medal for being the most distinguished candidate in General Surgery in that year.

In 1985 she was awarded the Gulbenkian Scholarship to undertake a PhD at Churchill College, University of Cambridge, which she completed in 1988.

In 1990, she performed Singapore's first successful liver transplant, and was the second female doctor in the world to perform such a transplant. The patient celebrated her 50th birthday in 2015.

In 2004, she was made a Fellow, Trinity College, University of Melbourne.

In 2006, She was awarded the Monash University Distinguished Alumnus Award

In 2007, the University of Newcastle awarded her an Honorary Degree of Doctor of Medicine.

== AI, Robotics and the Future of Companionship ==
Dr Susan Lim communicates her vision for a Future of Companionship, based on loneliness and disruptive new technologies, which gives rise to a whole new breed of companions.

In 2017, she gave an INK talk in Hyderabad, India, in the session "Giant leaps; thrilling potential of AI and Robotics, on the topic of the "Future of Companionship" .

She co-created the Lim Fantasy of Companionship for Piano and Orchestra recorded with the London Symphony Orchestra, London Voices, Pianist Tedd Joselson, at Abbey Road Studios, 19 November 2019.

This orchestral recording was released on 23 April 2021 on the signum records label

- Classical Explorer
- Churchill College Cambridge
- Planet Hugill 29 April 2021
- Planet Hugil 22 February 2021
- Colins Column

== Controversy ==
In February 2011, the Singapore Medical Council (SMC) presented a case to the Ministry of Health, in which Lim was accused of overcharging one of her patients, the sister of the Queen of Brunei, Pengiran Anak Hajah Damit Pg Pemancha Pg Anak Mohd Alam. The fees were approximately $24 million SGD and were charged for 110 treatment days from January to June 2007.

In August 2012, Lim was convicted of professional misconduct in respect of the overcharging, and was given a 3-year suspension from practising, fined $10,000 SGD and be censured in writing. Lim appealed her sentence and was allowed to continue practising, pending the outcome of the appeal.

On 28 June 2013, the appeal court dismissed her appeal and confirmed the sentence in all respects.

The SMC originally sought $1.33 million from Lim for the legal bills of the court case. The Singapore High Court found that the legal bills against her were inflated and reduced the amount from S$1.33 million to S$317,000. The SMC appealed the decision and the courts eventually allowed for $825,000 in legal bills to be claimed from Lim.
