= NUS High School of Math and Science =

Specialised independent school in Singapore

NUS High School of Mathematics and Science
- Sekolah Tinggi NUS bagi Matematik dan Sains (Malay) 新加坡国立大学附属数理中学 (Chinese) என்.யு.எஸ் கணக்கு மற்றும் அறிவியல் உயா் பள்ளி (Tamil)

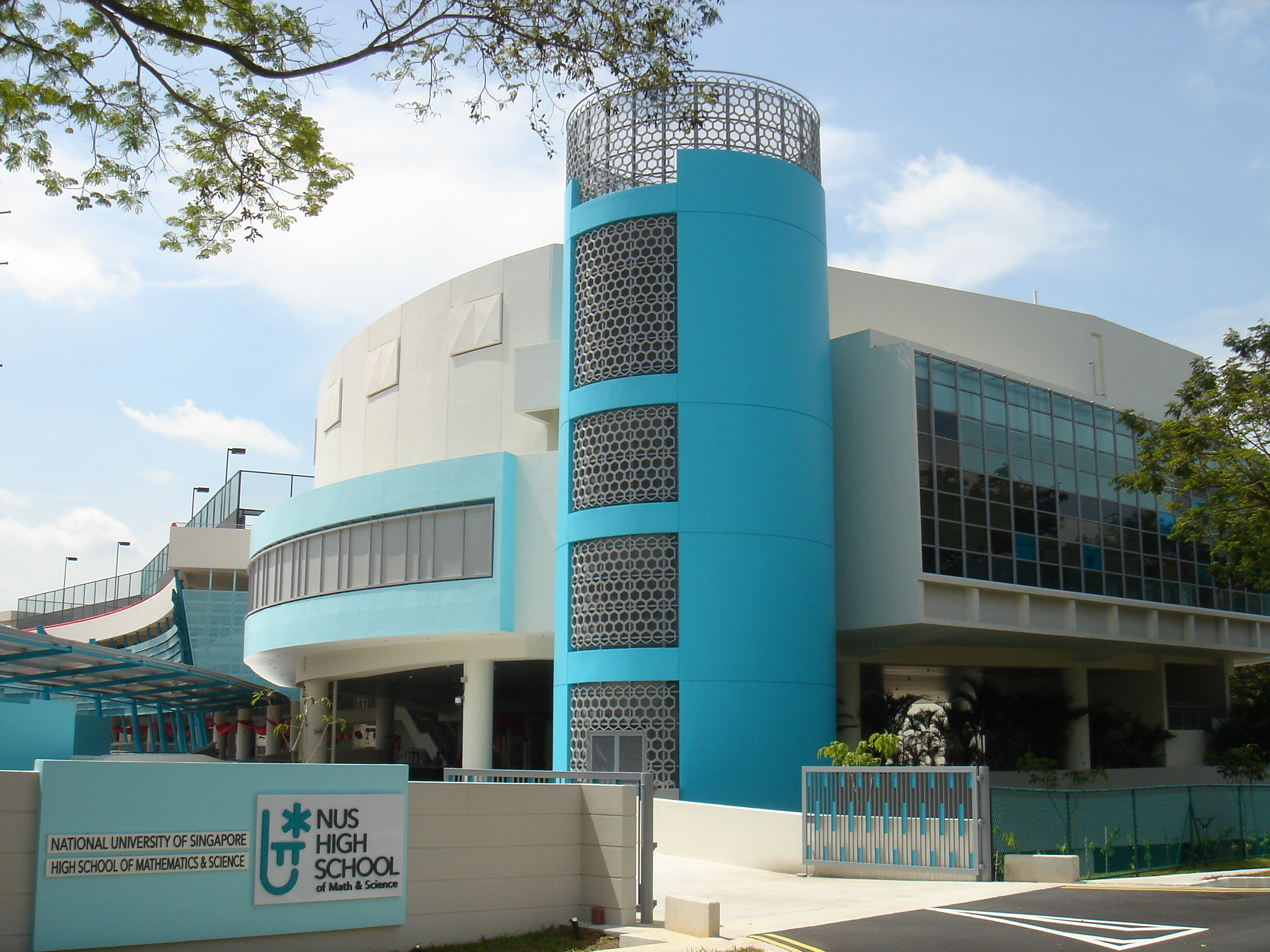

Location
- 20 Clementi Avenue 1 Singapore, Singapore, Singapore, 129957; Singapore; 1.306911°N 103.769356°E

Information
- Type: Specialised Independent
- Motto: Experiment. Explore. Excel.
- Established: 1 January 2005
- Session: Single session
- Principal: Soh Lai Leng Magdalen
- Gender: Co-ed
- Age range: 12-18
- Enrollment: 1200
- Student to teacher ratio: 12:1
- Classrooms: 64
- Houses: Faraday, Fibonacci, Fleming, Nobel
- Colour: Pantone 3272 Pantone 432 White
- Affiliation: National University of Singapore
- Website: nushigh.edu.sg

The NUS High School of Math and Science, also known as NUS High School or NUSH, is a specialised independent high school in Singapore offering a six-year Integrated Programme (IP) leading to the NUS High School Diploma. Its parent university is the National University of Singapore.

== Curriculum ==
=== Academic curriculum ===
NUS High School is an Integrated Programme school, which allows students to bypass the GCE O Levels. However, unlike other Integrated Programme schools, it does not offer GCE A Level or International Baccalaureate programmes. Instead, it offers an NUS High School Diploma, which all universities in Singapore recognise, as well as universities worldwide.

The diploma's curriculum is based on a modular system similar to its parent university NUS. Core modules are compulsory, elective modules help deepen the student's knowledge and may be compulsory for a major in a particular subject, and enrichment modules are purely for the student's interests. The school uses a 5-point grade point average (GPA) system, similar to the system used worldwide.

The school's mathematics and science curriculums are considered accelerated - topics are usually covered earlier than other schools. For example, the mole is introduced in Year 2 instead of Year 3, kinematics in Year 1 and Year 2 instead of Year 5, calculus in Year 3, and molecular biology and genetics in Year 3 instead of Year 6. Students may also take accelerated subjects where they learn concepts earlier than non-accelerated students.

The school offers elective programmes which may or may not count toward the GPA. Students may choose up to two electives which will be held at the end of the day. Examples of electives include Physics/Chemistry/Biology/Informatics Olympiad Training.

The school also offers honours courses in the Specialisation Stage for mathematical and scientific disciplines. The curriculum in these honours courses usually covers university material, such as linear algebra in mathematics, calculus-based electromagnetism in physics, organic synthesis and spectroscopy in chemistry, and proteomics in biology.

To graduate with the NUS High School diploma, students must major in mathematics and at least two science subjects (including computer studies).

Students may choose to take a fourth subject from any subject group (sciences, humanities & the arts), or take any mathematics or science subject at the honours level. In addition, students must complete an Advanced Research Project under the school's Da Vinci Research Programme. Finally, students must have a GPA above 2.5/5.

Students are also encouraged to take Advanced Placement and SAT examinations in their senior years for credits for admission into foreign universities, though these are not necessary for graduation.

=== Research curriculum ===
All students go through a research curriculum called the Da Vinci Programme. As part of the curriculum, all students must complete an Advanced Research Project which is included in the student's school grades.

=== Sports ===
NUS High School offers various sports to choose from as part of its options for co-curricular activities. The compulsory physical education modules from Years 1 to 6 also cover sports such as football, netball, basketball, badminton, floorball, baseball, outdoor education, and so on.

=== Performing Arts ===
NUS High School also offers various performing arts co-curricular activities, such as Chinese Orchestra, High School Choir, Dance Club, Drama Club, and School Orchestra.

=== Houses ===
Students are sorted at random into one of four houses upon matriculation. The four houses, named Faraday, Fibonacci, Fleming and Nobel, bear the colours yellow, red, blue and green respectively. An annual house challenge is held between the houses.

== Admissions ==
Students are primarily admitted to the school in Year 1 or Year 3 after a selection process comprising tests and group activities in which they are assessed for their understanding and passion in mathematics and the sciences. The school attracts the top 10% of Singapore's national cohort of primary school students. Annually, it receives over 2000 applications from both local and international students for its Year 1 admissions, enrolling about 180 students, giving an admissions rate of below 8.5%.

== Campus ==
=== Location ===
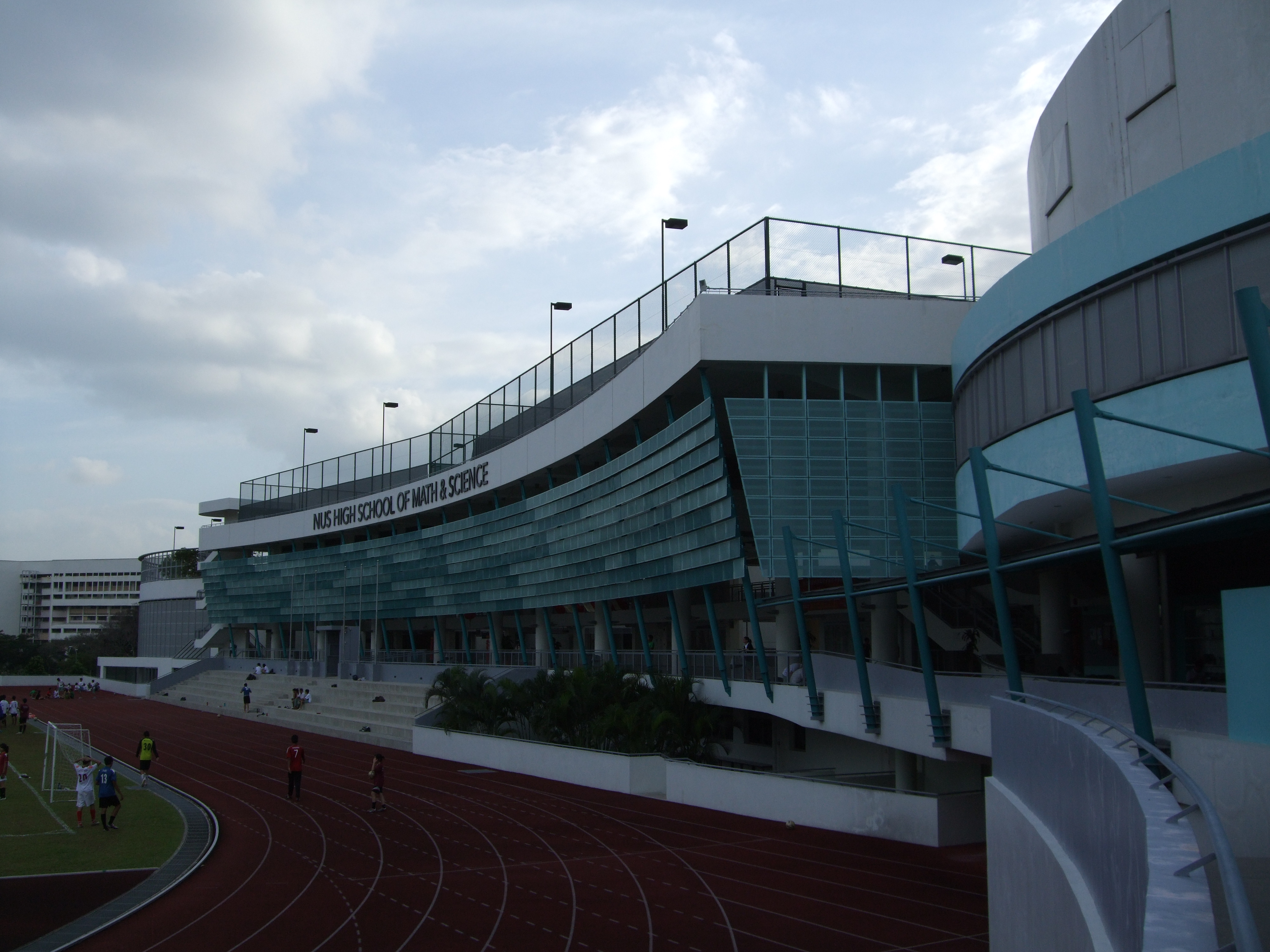
Pi(π) Wall, Track, Field, Concourse

Currently, the NUS High School campus sits on 4.7 hectares of land off Clementi Ave 1. The school moved operations from its temporary campus at the former Raffles Junior College grounds at Mount Sinai Road in 2005.

=== Building features ===
Due to the school's specialisation in mathematics and science, the building features many designs relating to mathematics and science. These include, but are not limited to, a drawing of the four DNA bases (ACGT) on the roof of the concourse, a timeline of major mathematical discoveries, and coloured metal shades to represent the digits of pi.

=== NUS High School Residence (Boarding School) ===
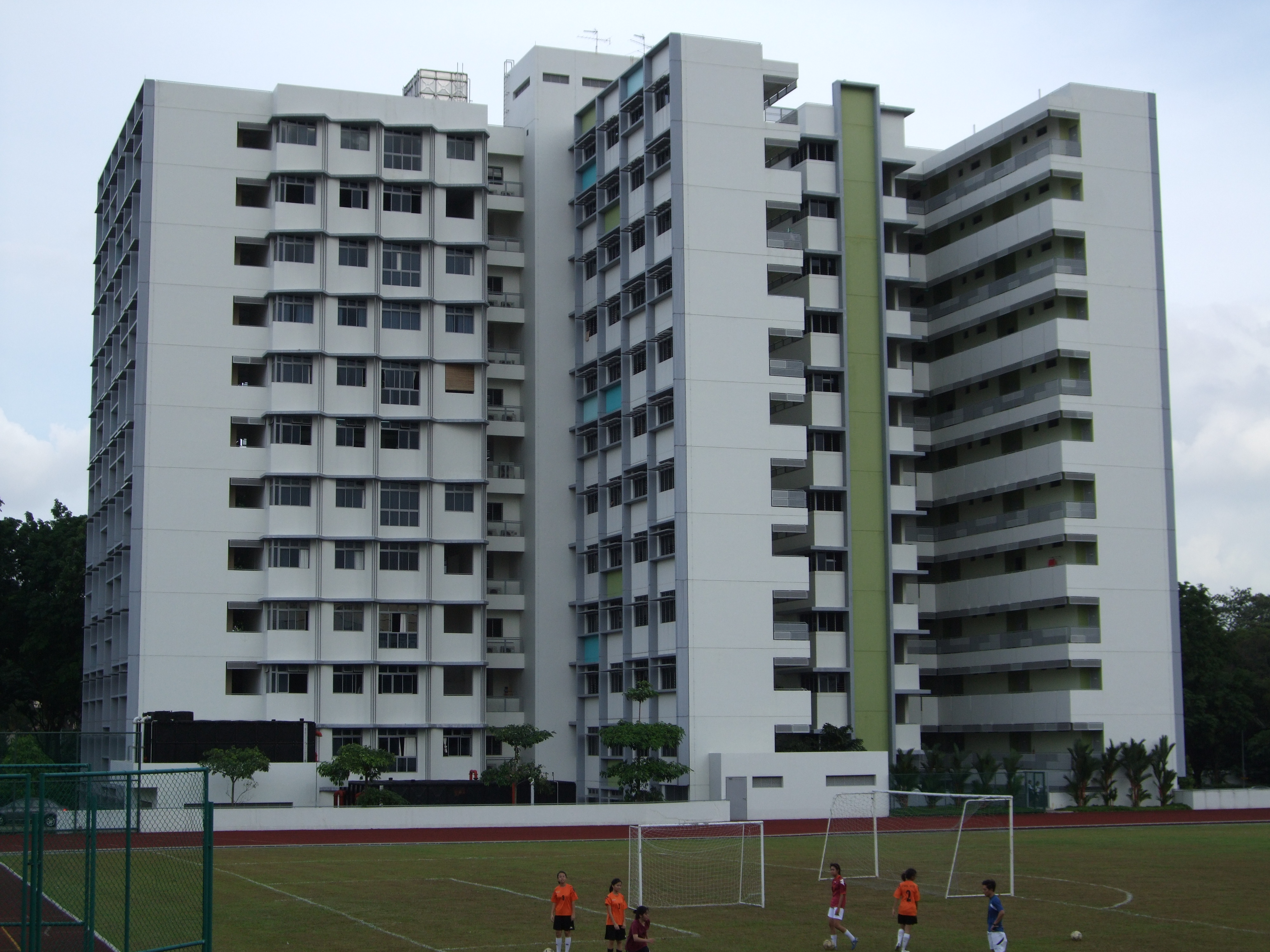
NUS High School Residence Twin-Building (January 2009)

The campus includes a boarding school (NUS High School Residence) consisting of two blocks that can accommodate around 500 residents. Facilities include studying areas and rooms, a gym, pantries, media rooms (TV and relaxation), game rooms, music rooms and laundry rooms. The boarding school is also open to scholars studying within or outside of the school and serves as the site for the school's boarding programme.

Students are required to live in the NUS High Boarding School in Year 5.

=== NUS Libraries ===
The library at NUS High School (known as the Node) is part of the NUS Library system. NUS High School students and staff can access the loaning, catalogue and transaction resources of NUS Libraries from the Node. NUS teaching staff can request books in other NUS Libraries to be transferred to the Node.

== Key partners ==
=== Parent institution ===
- National University of Singapore (NUS)

NUSH is the only high school in Singapore to be supported by a parent university. For example, NUS provides the school with a swimming pool for water-related sports. Students are given the opportunity to attend undergraduate courses in NUS during their Specialisation Stage. NUS undergraduate courses in Biology, Physics, Chemistry, Mathematics, Computer Science and Engineering are offered to students, to be taken in lieu of honours courses offered by NUSH.

== Principals ==
- 2005 – 2007: Associate professor Lai Yee Hing
- 2007 – 2015: Hang Kim Hoo
- 2016 – 2019: Lee Bee Yann
- 2020 – Present: Soh Lai Leng Magdalen

== See also ==
- Education in Singapore
