= Eunoia Junior College =

- Maktab Rendah Eunoia 诺雅初级学院 யூனோய தொடக்கக் கல்லூரி

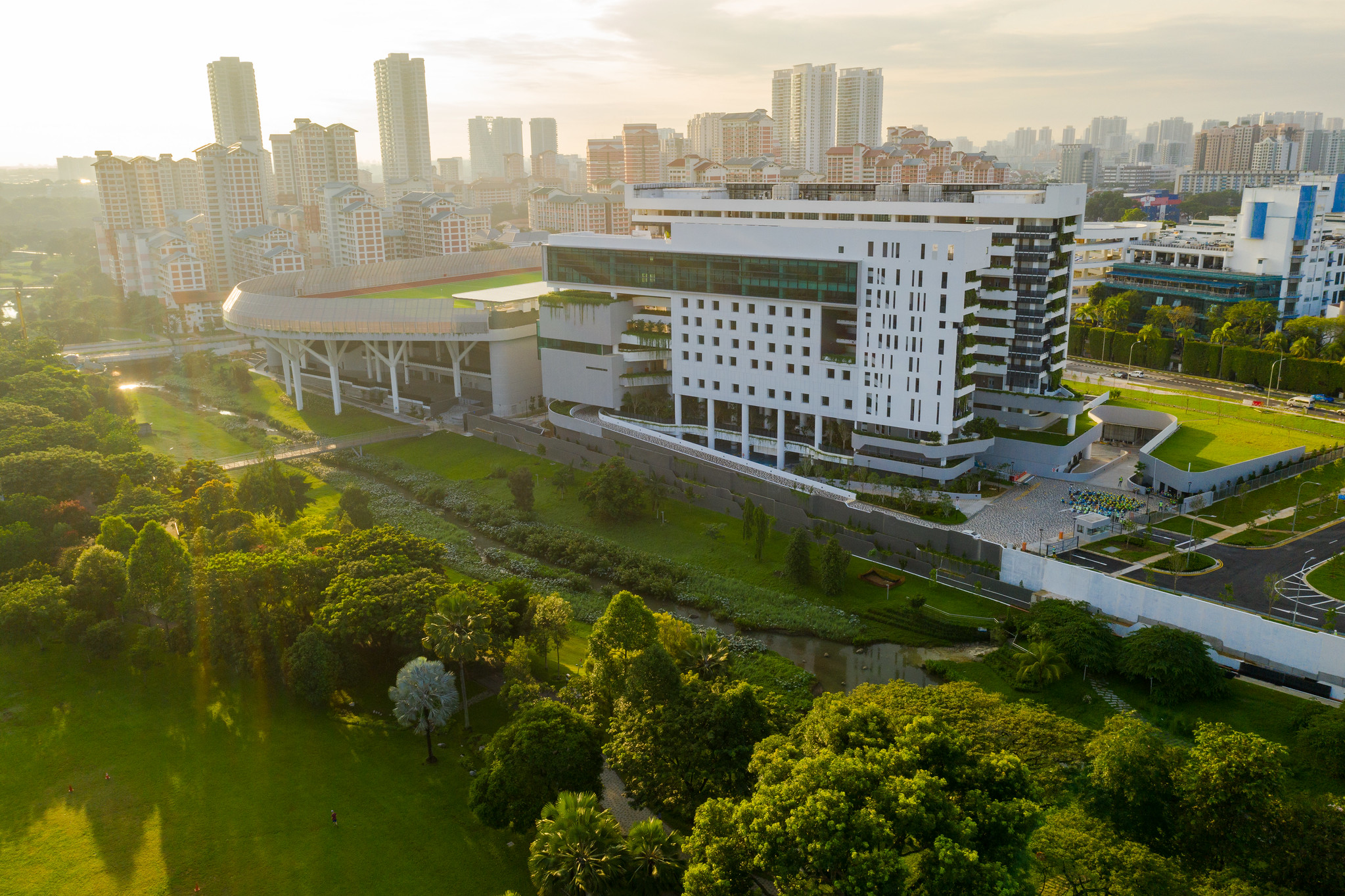
- Eunoia Junior College Bishan Campus

Location
- 2 Sin Ming Place, Singapore 573838; Bishan, Singapore; 1.3630442161452725°N 103.83948051861982°E

Information
- Type: Government; Co-educational; Integrated Programme
- Motto: Beautiful Thinking, Goodwill to All
- Established: 2017; 9 years ago
- School code: 0714
- Principal: Mr Andrew Tan Eng Hian
- Teaching staff: 120
- Gender: Mixed
- Enrollment: 1,250
- Campus size: 4 ha
- Color: Blue Gold White
- Mascot: Otter
- Affiliations: NA
- Vision: Every Eunoian a Youth with Purpose, Thinker with Heart, Leader with Courage
- Website: www.eunoiajc.moe.edu.sg

Eunoia Junior College (EJC) is a junior college in Singapore which offers Integrated Programme (IP) with Catholic High School, Singapore Chinese Girls' School and CHIJ Saint Nicholas Girls' School. It is located in Bishan, close to Bright Hill MRT station and Bishan MRT station.

== History ==
Plans for Eunoia Junior College were first announced on 1 September 2010 as part of an expansion of the Integrated Programme (IP) to seven more schools. The new Junior College was targeted to be set up by 2017, serving IP students from three schools as there was no model for such a Junior College at that time.

Eunoia Junior College was established alongside the Catholic High School – CHIJ St. Nicholas Girls' School – Singapore Chinese Girls' School Joint Integrated Programme (JIP), which accepted the first cohort of IP Year One students in January 2013. The name of the junior college was announced on 29 December 2015 by Acting Minister of Education (Schools), Ng Chee Meng, in an MOE ceremony at Shangri-La Hotel to appoint and appreciate the country's principals.

Eunoia Junior College welcomed its pioneer batch of students in 2017 and held its inaugural assembly on 20 February that year.

From 2017 to 2019, the college was located at an interim campus at 53 Mount Sinai Road, formerly the site of Raffles Junior College. It was announced that the college's permanent campus located off the junction of Sin Ming Avenue and Marymount Road will be ready in late 2019, owing to the delay in the construction of the Cross Island line.

The college moved to its Bishan campus on 6 January 2020, located at Sin Ming Place, starting with a 14 km relay from Mount Sinai to Bishan. The new site is integrated with the future Marymount Community Club and is Singapore's first high-rise Junior College.

== Principals ==
Name of Principal	Years served	Ref
Cheang Mei Heng	2014–2021	
Andrew Tan Eng Hian	2022–Present	

== Identity and culture ==
College Name

Eunoia (yoo-noh-iea) means beautiful thinking, goodwill to all, and a bridging of the heart and the mind. Eunoia is an English word with Greek origins, and is made up of two parts: 'eu' meaning good and 'noia' referring to the mind.

=== College crest ===
The crest of Eunoia Junior College was designed by Kong Studio, a local design firm with strong portfolio of various oriental branding work. The crest is being annotated with three aspects of the college's strategic trust "All-round Development, Beautiful Thinking and Cultural Conversance".

The design of the crest is inspired by the neural networks of the human brain, and which portrays the motto of beautiful thinking. The circular shape of the crest signifies the holistic development of the students, while the oriental theme provides a contrast to the college's name "Eunoia" adapted from the western Greek. It encompasses the vision for the students to rooted to their own cultural heritage and to embrace and thrive in diverse cultural settings of a globalised world.

=== College attire and appearance ===
The white-and-grey school uniform of Eunoia Junior College was designed by two students, with optimisation by an appointed designer.

=== College anthem ===
The college anthem of Eunoia Junior College was composed by ten students from the Joint Integrated Programme in 2016. The anthem was officially launched in February 2017.

== Admission and affiliations ==
Eunoia Junior College is the junior college (JC) partner of Catholic High School, CHIJ St Nicholas Girls' School and Singapore Chinese Girls' School under the Joint Integrated Programme. The majority of its students will be enrolled through the Integrated Programme (IP) at Catholic High School, CHIJ St Nicholas Girls' School and Singapore Chinese Girls' School, while a quarter of the enrolment places are reserved for students enrolling through the Junior College Joint Admission Exercise with their Singapore-Cambridge GCE Ordinary Level results.

== Academic information ==
=== Academic subjects ===
Eunoia Junior College offers the following subjects listed as in 2020.

H1 Level	H2 Level	H3 Level
General Paper; Project Work; Mathematics; Economics; Geography; History; Chinese; Malay; Tamil; Chinese-B; Malay-B; Tamil-B	Knowledge and Inquiry; Economics; Geography; History; Literature in English; China Studies in Chinese; Chinese Language and Literature; Translation (Chinese); Malay Language and Literature; Tamil Language and Literature; Art; Music; Mathematics; Further Mathematics; Physics; Chemistry; Biology; French; German; Japanese	Biology; Chemistry; Physics; Mathematics; History; Economics; Geography; Music; Art; Chinese Language and Literature; Literature in English
