= Catholic High School, Singapore =

Catholic High School 公教中学

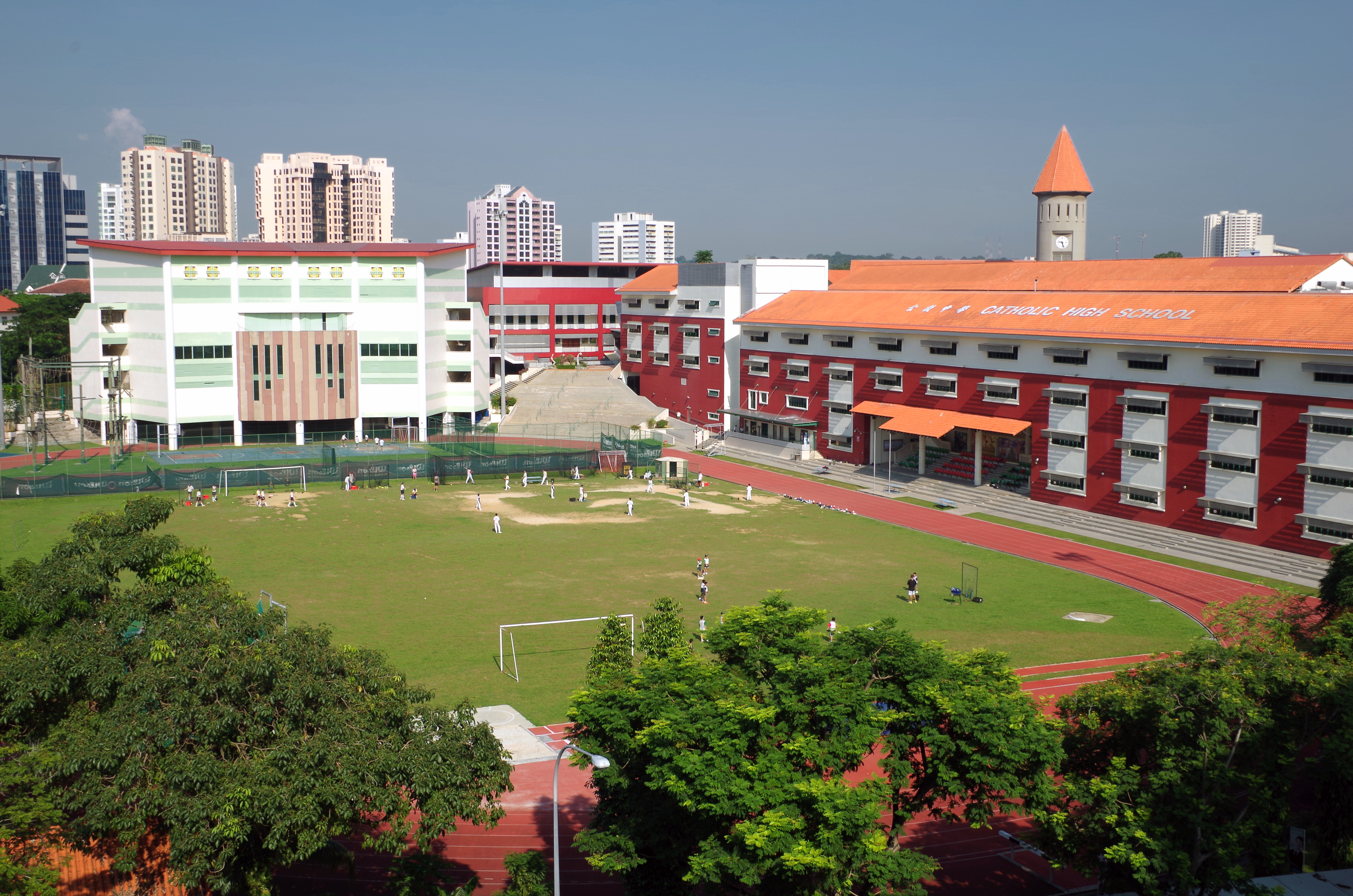
- A view of the school with its clocktower

Location
- 9 Bishan Street 22, Singapore 579767; Bishan, Singapore; 1°21′17″N 103°50′41″E

Information
- Type: Government-aided, Autonomous, Special Assistance Plan (SAP); Integrated Programme
- Motto: 亲爱忠诚，敬业乐群 (Care, Honesty, Service)
- Religious affiliation: Catholicism
- Established: 1935; 91 years ago
- Founder: Reverend Father Edward Becheras, M.E.P.
- Sister school: CHIJ Saint Nicholas Girls' School
- School code: 7102 ('O' Level Programme); 9131 (Integrated Programme)
- Principal: Yvonne Teo
- Gender: Male
- Enrolment: 1,400 (secondary); 1,600 (primary)
- Language: English; Chinese
- Campus size: 7 hectares (17 acres)
- Color: Red Green Blue Yellow
- Affiliation: Catholic Junior College; Eunoia Junior College (for IP); Catholic High School Petaling Jaya (historical ties via Marist Brothers); Catholic High School Melaka (historical ties via Marist Brothers); Catholic High School Sibu (historical ties via Marist Brothers)
- Website: www.catholichigh.moe.edu.sg

Catholic High School (CHS) is a government-aided autonomous Catholic boys' school in Bishan, Singapore, founded in 1935 by a French missionary, Reverend Father Edward Becheras. One of the Special Assistance Plan schools in Singapore, it has a primary section offering a six-year programme and a secondary section offering a four-year programme. Since 2013, it has partnered with Eunoia Junior College for a six-year Integrated Programme, which allows its secondary students to proceed to Eunoia for Years 5 and 6 and take the Singapore-Cambridge GCE Advanced Level examinations at the end of Year 6.

== History ==
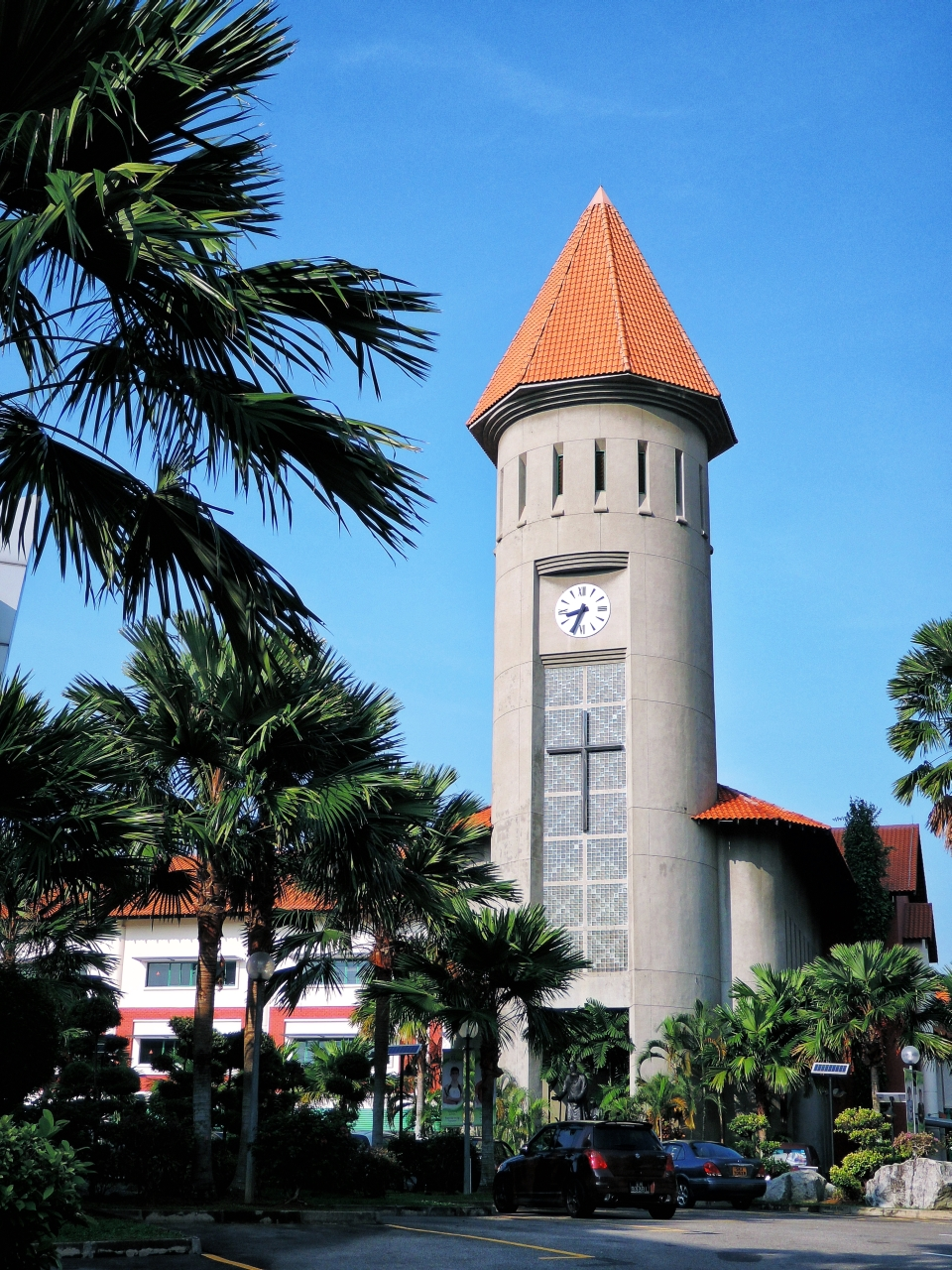
Clock tower of Catholic High School

=== 1935–1942: Establishment as Sino-English Catholic School ===
Catholic High School was founded in 1935 as Sino-English Catholic School (英华公教中学) by the Reverend Father Edward Becheras, a French missionary. Although it was a Catholic school, it accepted both Catholic and non-Catholic students, and was run along the lines of a Sino-English school. The school first started as an extension of the Church of Saints Peter and Paul. Fr Becheras envisaged the school as a bilingual institution from the start, emphasising instruction in both English and Chinese, a policy that continues today.

In 1936, Sino-English Catholic School moved into a purpose built school building at 222 Queen Street, beside the Church of St. Peter and Paul. Two years after the new school campus was completed, it reached its maximum capacity. Among notable features of the old school is the science room in the school, the first such feature in any Catholic school in Malaya. The school was renamed Catholic High School in 1939.

=== 1950–1974: Management by the Marist Brothers ===
In 1950, the Marist Brothers took over responsibility for the administration of Catholic High; a primary section was opened in 1951, with a new school building at 8 Queen Street. A boarding house for Catholic High students was also built. Under the supervision of the Marist Brothers, Maris Stella High School, was also founded in 1958 to ease overwhelming applications for admission to Catholic High School.

In 1954, Catholic High School expelled all seventy students who were involved in the National Service riots for their absence from class. Catholic High School was the only institution that carried out expulsion as follow-up actions.

Pre-university classes were offered in Catholic High School between 1952 and 1975, with a number of graduates attaining the President's Scholarship.

In 1956, Rev. Philippe Wu, the school’s second principal, relocated to Kuala Lumpur to establish Catholic High School, which was permanently moved to Petaling Jaya in 1958. The Marist Brothers subsequently expanded their mission by founding additional schools across Malaya and the North Borneo States (now Malaysia), including in Bentong (1957), Melaka (1958), Sibu (1960), and Tanjung Malim (1960). To this day, the schools in Singapore, Petaling Jaya, Melaka, and Sibu continue to share the same school anthem, with only the opening phrase adapted to reflect their respective locations, namely ‘公教中学 屹立星洲’ (Singapore), ‘公教中学 屹立雪州’ (Petaling Jaya), ‘公教中学 屹立甲州’ (Melaka), and ‘公教中学 屹立砂州’ (Sibu).

=== 1974–present: Management by the Catholic diocese ===
In 1974, the administration of the school was handed back to the Catholic diocese. Before the full nationwide adoption of the junior college system in 1975, Catholic High School was the only Chinese-medium high school in Singapore that offered both the Chinese-medium Senior High Certificate (华校高中文凭) and the English-medium Cambridge GCE Advanced Level examinations to all of its students.

The Catholic High School was classified under the Special Assistance Plan in 1979. This enables it to offer students in the top 10% of the cohort both English and Chinese as their first languages. In the same year, pre-primary classes were started to prepare students for primary school Chinese study.

=== 1987–1992: Relocation of students ===
In March 1986, discovery of structural cracks at the Queen Street premises of the primary section caused the campus to be declared unsafe. Despite clarification later as a misjudgment, the incident prompted a decision by the Ministry of Education to relocate Catholic High School, for safety concerns in wake of the Hotel New World collapse. The primary school section was relocated to the premises of Guangyang Secondary School in Bishan at the start of the 1987 academic year, before moving again two and a half years later in mid-1989 to the premises of what is now Ai Tong Primary School in 10 Bright Hill Drive (in Sin Ming / Bishan; close to the current Bright Hill MRT station). Both the primary and secondary sections of the school then collectively moved as one, to the school's current, permanent campus at Bishan Street 22 in mid-1992.

=== 1992–present ===
In 2008, Catholic High School was awarded the School Distinction Award under the MOE Master Plan of Awards, in recognition of its value-added holistic development of its students through exemplary processes and practices.

In 2009, the Singapore Art Museum took over the former primary building of Catholic High School at 8 Queen Street and developed it as an arts house named SAM@8Q.

On 1 September 2010 the Ministry of Education announced that Catholic High School would become an Integrated Programme school in 2013. It partners CHIJ Saint Nicholas Girls' School and Singapore Chinese Girls' School in the programme, and students from the school will proceed to Eunoia Junior College from 2017.

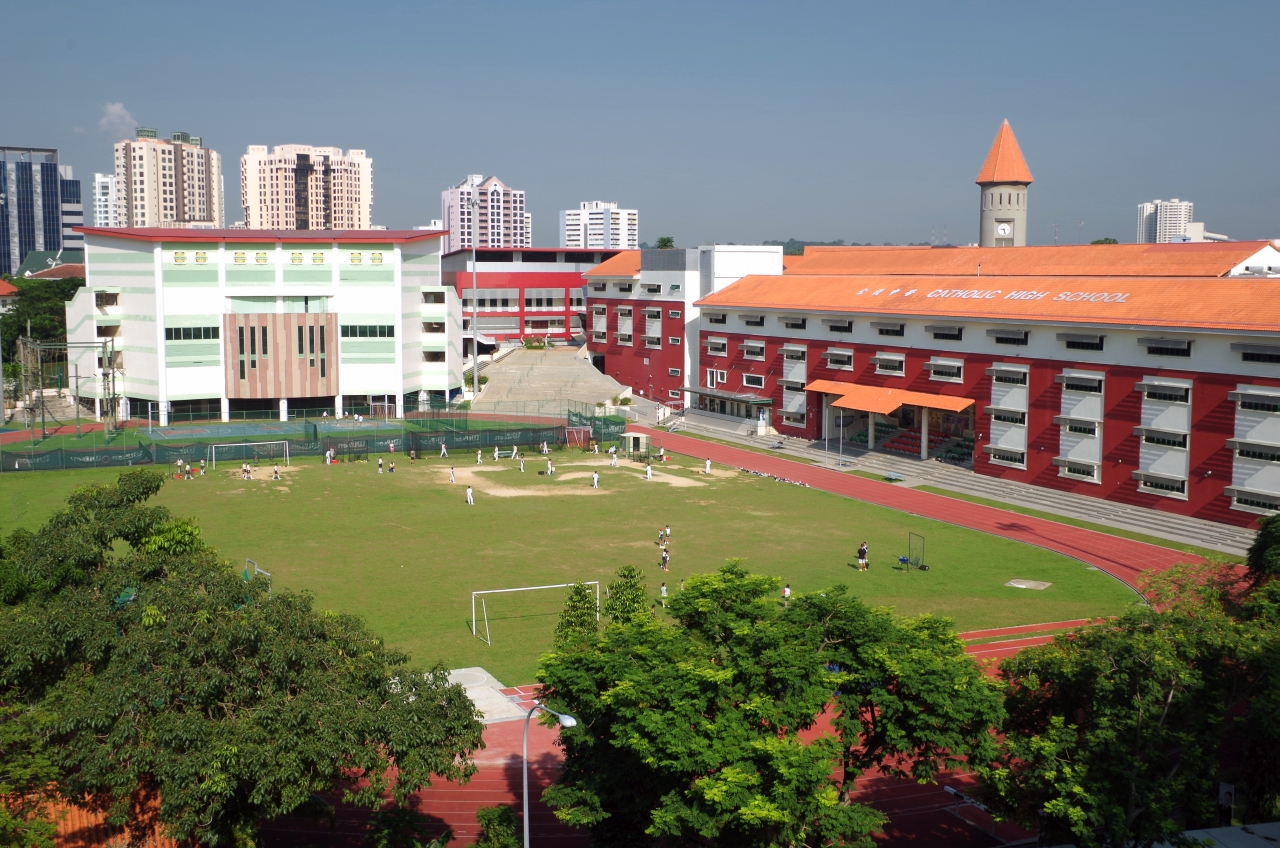
Catholic High School Bishan Campus

== School identity and culture ==
=== Dress code ===
Catholic High School is one of only a handful of Singapore secondary schools to have uniforms complemented with short trousers for all levels. The rule was well supported by the students, stating its convenience and comfort in the local climate.

== Campus ==
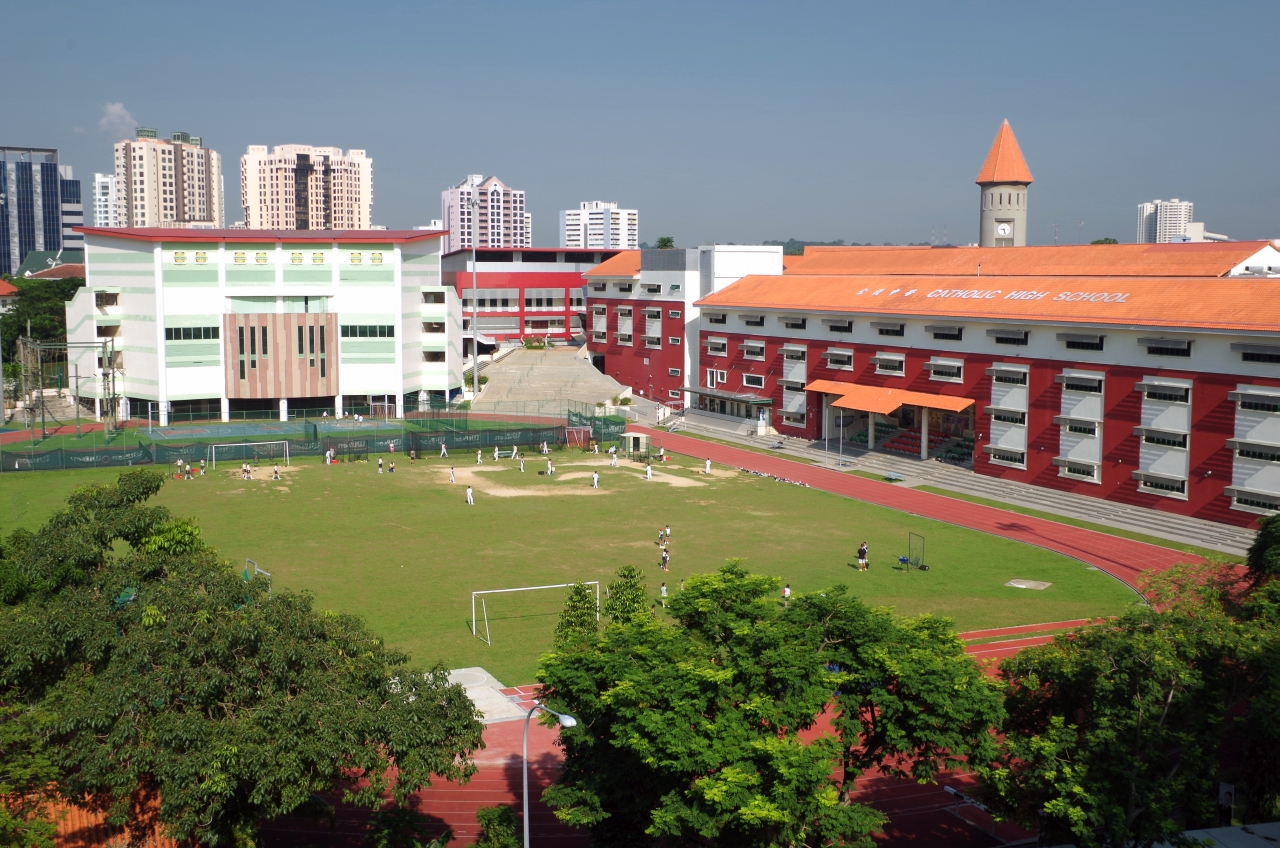
Catholic High School Bishan Campus

The seven-hectare Catholic High campus consists of two blocks, primary and secondary. There are five floors as well as a basement. Usually, classrooms for Primary 1 and 2 students are on the first and second floors, while classes for Primary 3, 4, 5 and 6 are on the higher floors. A common area is shared between these two blocks, where the secondary plaza and two school halls are located. The two air-conditioned, multi-purpose halls serve as venues for assembly, large-scale talks, performing arts events, and indoor sporting activities. In addition, another smaller auditorium is used for lectures, talks and performing arts events. Secondary 4 students have their classrooms on level 5 which are also air-conditioned. There are also computer rooms, science laboratories and an eco-garden and a bamboo forest on the primary and secondary campus respectively. Two canteens, as well as a cafeteria, serve food for both the primary and secondary students. Students can also buy school materials at the bookshop.

The school campus also houses a 400m running track and a multipurpose open field. There are a discus cage, javelin-throwing ground, two tennis courts and a basketball court. The Indoor Sports Hall, which was completed in December 2008, consists of two large halls stacked on top of each other. It houses two basketball courts, volleyball courts and badminton courts. There are two gyms on the secondary campus. On the primary campus, there is a multipurpose hall that is half the size of the Indoor Sports Hall. Catholic High is one of few schools with an in-campus sports class, where students go through rigorous sports and academic courses. Sports Class students may choose to take Physical Education as an 'O' Level subject, in addition to the standard 'O' Level curriculum.

A new high elements rope course was completed in 2010, but was demolished in 2025. In the mid-2010s, the new PERI building was built which has the school's only lift. This houses the school's table tennis rooms, the secondary section's student leadership board room, and others. In 2025, the school announced the construction of 2 lifts at the Indoor Sports Hall and the secondary campus block, which allows for better accessibility around the school, to be completed by mid-2026.

The school hall of the Catholic High was a training venue for athletes competing in gymnastics events of the 2010 Youth Olympic Games.

== Student Leadership Board (SLB) ==
Catholic High School has 3 student leadership boards. The Class Management Committee (CMC) mainly manages and plans class-based events, such Chinese New Year class decoration, Check Out Day games, as well as arrange chairs for events like Parent-Teacher Meeting, but also plans school events such as GongJiao Got Talent and GradNite. The Prefectorial Board (PB) mainly ensures discipline around the school by booking rule breakers and latecomers, but also manages and plans school events like Teachers' Day and EAS Day. The Students' Council (SC) mainly "hears the student voice" by helping with student welfare through bubble tea and welfare pack distribution, as well as helps with cheer support at National School Games (NSG) events, but also manages and plans for events like Orientation.

== Academic information ==
Catholic High School has offered the Music Elective Programme since 2011. This four-year programme allows students who have an interest in music to study music at a higher level, leading to a GCE O-level Higher Music certificate.

=== CHS-SNGS-SCGS Joint Integrated Programme ===
Catholic High School jointly offers the Integrated Programme (IP) in collaboration with CHIJ St Nicholas Girls' School, Singapore Chinese Girls' School and Eunoia Junior College from 2013. Under the programme, students may skip the Singapore-Cambridge GCE Ordinary Level examination in the respective schools, and complete year 5 & 6 of pre-university education in Eunoia Junior College leading to the Singapore-Cambridge GCE Advanced Level examination. Every year, students of the Integrated Programme track have World Readiness Programme (WRP) symposiums with students of CHIJ St Nicholas Girls' School and Singapore Chinese Girls' School.

As a dual-track school, 4-year Secondary Special/Express course is offered alongside the Integrated Programme.
