= Jennie Chua =

Singaporean businesswoman

Jennie Chua Kheng Yeng DUBC BBM PBM PPA(P)
- Born: 25 May 1944 (age 82); Batam, Indonesia
- Education: Cornell University (BS); Anglo-Chinese School; Singapore Chinese Girls' School
- Spouse: Goh Kian Chee (m. 1968; div. 1977)
- Children: 2

Chinese name
- Traditional Chinese: 蔡瓊瑩
- Simplified Chinese: 蔡琼莹
- Hanyu Pinyin: Cài Qióngyíng
- IPA: [tsʰâɪ.tɕʰiʊ̌ŋ.ǐŋ]

Jennie Chua Kheng Yeng DUBC BBM PBM PPA(P) is a Singaporean businesswoman who is the co-founder of Beeworks, Inc. She was named one of Forbes Asia's "50 Women In the Mix" in 2013. She has been called "Singapore's Grande Dame".

== Early life and education ==
Chua was born in Batam, Indonesia and raised in the Tanglin area of Singapore. She is the oldest of 12 children. Her father, Chua Kok Kuan, was a wealthy businessman who sold cloves and nutmeg, but lost his business when she was 10.

Chua was educated at Singapore Chinese Girls' School and started working as a teenager, as a typist and tutor. After completing her A-levels at Anglo-Chinese School, she was awarded a scholarship to attend the Nanyang University, where she dropped out after a year to work as a teacher at St. Margaret's School.

In 1968, together with her husband, Chua moved to upstate New York and studied at Cornell University. She graduated with a Bachelor of Science in hotel management.

== Career ==
After graduation, Chua started working as a general manager at the Mandarin Hotel in Singapore. In 1977, she started working, for 11 years, at the Singapore Tourism Board (STB), as director. In 1988, she started working for Westin Hotels as a marketing director.

Chua became the first female general manager at Raffles Hotel in 1990. In 2003, she became the chief executive officer of Raffles Holdings but left Raffles Holdings in 2007. She became the chief executive officer of Ascott Group, a department of CapitaLand, she subsequently became the chief corporate officer for CapitaLand. She left the company in July 2012.

Chua is the co-founder of Beeworks. Today, she is 40% of the company's shares. Her work is currently focused on the fast food market in Singapore.

She is a former teacher at the Asian Institute of Tourism in the Philippines. Chua is also Singapore's Ambassador to Mexico, and former Ambassador to Slovakia.

== Personal life ==
In 1960, when she was 16, Chua met Goh Kian Chee, son of Goh Keng Swee. On 1 June 1968, the couple married and held their wedding at Bethesda (Katong) Church, but divorced in 1977. The couple have two children.

== Awards and decorations ==
- Distinguished Service Order, in 2024.
- Public Service Star, in 2008.
- Public Service Medal, in 2004.
- Public Administration Medal (Silver), in 1984.
