= Asian Private Banker =

American financial newspaper company

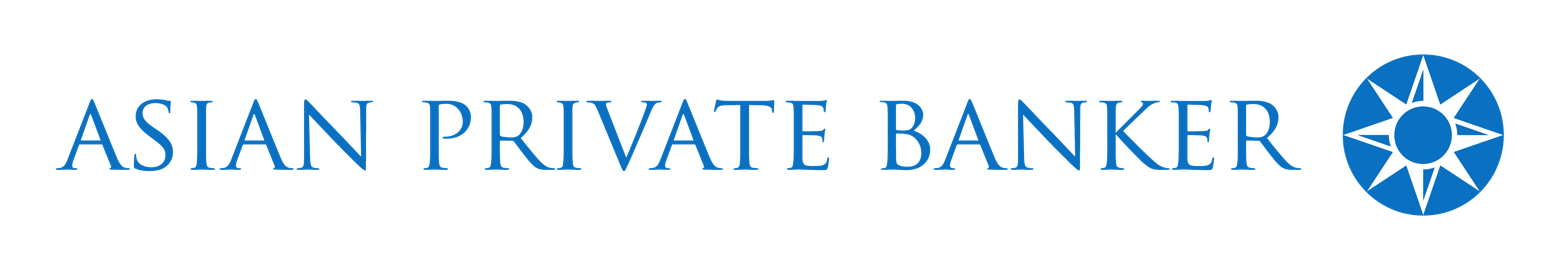
- Type: Specialist media company
- Format: Website, newsletter, events and awards
- Owner: Key Positioning Limited
- Founder: Andrew Shale
- Editor: Audrey Raj (2025 – )
- Founded: 2009
- Language: English
- Headquarters: Hong Kong
- ISSN: 2076-5320
- Website: www.asianprivatebanker.com

Asian Private Banker is a B2B financial media company that informs and connects members of the private banking and private wealth communities in the Asia-Pacific region and its connected areas.

== History ==
Asian Private Banker was founded in November 2009 by Andrew Shale, who also is the Chief Executive Officer.

== Audience ==
The platform primarily serves C-suite executives, fund selection specialists, relationship managers, and broader investment professionals across the APAC region. It also draws in service providers, including technology companies, consultancy firms, and PR agencies, who cater to wealth management firms and are keen to stay updated on the latest trends in the region.

== Content ==
=== Digital ===
The website provides definitive daily intelligence and news services on the major trends, personnel changes, market data, and regulations affecting Asia's private banking and wealth management industries.

=== Events ===
Asian Private Banker hosts large events for regional and global private banking and wealth management leaders. The annual Asian Private Banker Summits in Hong Kong and Singapore attract senior talent from across Asia’s private banks and wealth management sector, with a reputation for their large of audiences, breadth and depth of content and the seniority of participating speakers. The company also produces more business function-focused events, including a DPM series, a Fund Selector series, and an Alternatives series. It also conducts market-focused events that highlight the latest trends and opportunities in Thailand and China.

=== Data and Research ===
Asian Private Banker conducts incisive proprietary research on private banks, their product providers, and the various UHNW/HNW clients they serve. They also provide AUM (assets under management) and RM (relationship managers) League Tables, which are cited by industry sources as the most reliable of their kind. More recently, it has launched its Relationship Manager Compensation Report which provides insights into the financial compensation structures for private banking relationship managers based in Hong Kong and Singapore.

== See also ==
- Business Journalism
- List of newspapers in Hong Kong
- Periodical publication
