= Piyush Gupta =

Indian Singaporean banker (born 1960)

Piyush Gupta BBM
- पीयूष गुप्ता
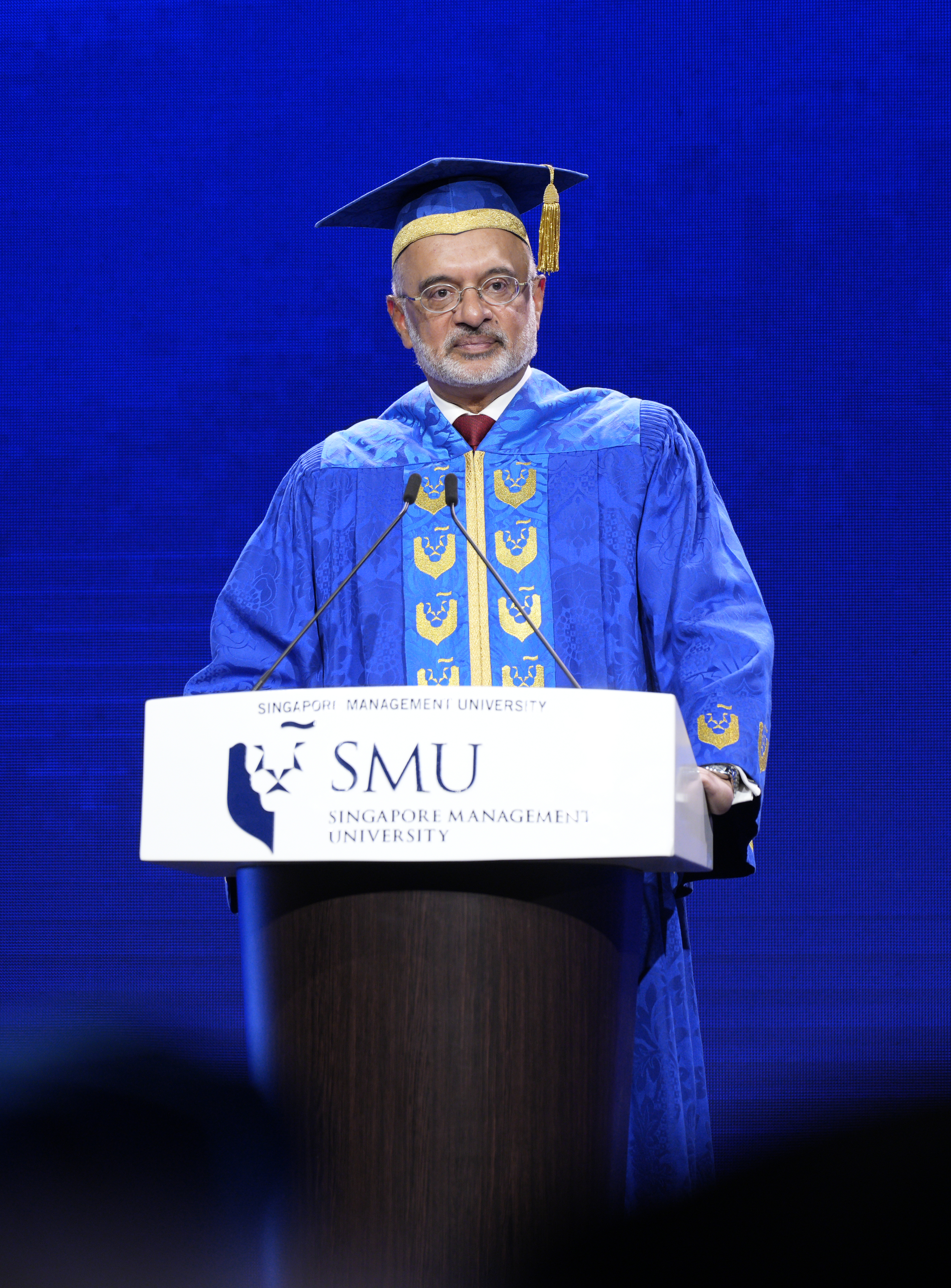
- Gupta in 2023
- Born: 24 January 1960 (age 66); Meerut, Uttar Pradesh, India
- Citizenship: Singapore
- Education: St. Stephen's College (BA); Delhi University; Indian Institute of Management Ahmedabad (PGDM)
- Occupations: Business executive; banker
- Title: Former CEO of DBS Group
- Spouse: Ruchira Gupta
- Children: 2

Piyush Gupta BBM (Hindi: पीयूष गुप्ता; born 24 January 1960) is a Singaporean banker and the chief executive officer (CEO) of DBS Group between 2009 and 2025. He has served as non-executive chairman of Keppel since April 2026 and as a member of Singapore's Council of Presidential Advisers since June 2026. He is also vice-chairman of the Institute of International Finance since 2013, and a board member of Enterprise Singapore since 2024.

== Early life and education ==
Gupta was one of three children, born in Meerut, India, to R.S. Gupta and Minnie Gupta. He attended St. Columba's High School and later earned a bachelor's degree in economics from St. Stephen's College, Delhi. After graduating, he joined the Indian Institute of Management, Ahmedabad for a Post Graduate Diploma in Management.

== Professional career ==
=== Career ===
In 1982 and at the age of 22, Gupta started his career at Citibank India as a management trainee. He did several assignments with Citibank India, eventually being the chief-of-staff to the India head. He moved to Singapore in 1991 as the chief-of-staff to the Asia head, and was posted to Indonesia in 1998, as country manager. In 2000, he left Citigroup to start up a dot-com company, but closed his venture and re-joined Citigroup in 2001. Gupta was country officer in Malaysia from 2002 to 2007, where he helped built up Citigroup's branch network, before assuming the role of country officer in Singapore and the head of the Corporate and Investment Bank in ASEAN. In 2008, Gupta was appointed the CEO of Citibank in South East Asia, Australia and New Zealand.

In 2009, he left Citigroup to join DBS Group as the CEO. As CEO, he received various business awards, and has been credited with growing DBS to become a leading Asian financial services group. Early on in 2013, Gupta also realized that DBS needed to start thinking like big tech. "Our frame of reference had to be Amazon or Alibaba. We had to stop thinking about what other banks will do. We had to start thinking about what big tech will do."

In 2018, Gupta addressed an audience of top business leaders at the Asia Leaders Series in Zürich, Switzerland, stating that "Few people have come to the recognition that Asia is no longer the factory of the world, it is the marketplace of the world." He then elaborated, "Anybody who wants to allocate capital and is not looking at riding on the Asian growth story over the next 10-15-20 years is really missing a big opportunity."

In 2020, he led DBS to launch two new exchanges, and undertake two acquisitions. Gupta has come out with the importance of future blockchain driven Web 3.0 world with the cautious conclusion at a panel discussion titled, Global Trends and Web 3.0 at the Singapore FinTech Festival in 2021.

Now, the problem with Web 3.0 is when you take that argument to the next phase, it's not only the intermediaries you start questioning. You don't need a central bank. You don't need the regulators. And by the way, guess what, you don't need nation states. You don't need governments. And then you start getting into this thing that is not a question of technology. That's a question of social politics, and a question of philosophy. Do we as mankind prefer to live in a world where eight billion of us are individual agents, without any organising principles such as countries, states, central banks, regulators and boundary keepers? I would argue that it is very, very hard for us to get there.

In 2024, he announced on August 7 that he would step down from his role on March 28, 2025. Tan Su Shan was appointed deputy CEO with immediate effect and will succeed him.

Gupta subsequently joined Keppel as deputy chairman and an independent non-executive director in July 2025. On 17 April 2026, he succeeded Danny Teoh as Keppel's non-executive chairman.

On 2 June 2026, Gupta was appointed a full member of Singapore's Council of Presidential Advisers, having served as an alternate member since August 2025.

== Personal life ==
Gupta enjoys reading and bird watching. He plays golf and badminton, and does crosswords. He is an ambassador for CanKids India, a non-governmental organisation that supports victims of childhood cancer. His wife, Ruchira, is a physiotherapist.

A long-time permanent resident of Singapore, Gupta was naturalized as a Singapore citizen in 2009. Gupta also possesses an Overseas Citizenship of India, a form of permanent residency for former citizens of India.
