= Ng Xuan Hui =

Singaporean sailor (born 1977)

Personal information
- Born: 1977 (age 48–49) Singapore

Sport
- Sport: Sailing

Ng Xuan Hui (Chinese: 黄玄慧; pinyin: Huáng Xuánhuì; born 1977) is a former Singaporean sailor and three-time Singapore National Olympic Council Sportsgirl of the Year in 1991, 1992, and 1993. She was a gold medalist at the 1991 and 1993 Southeast Asian Games.

Ng is the eldest child of International Olympic Committee vice-president Ng Ser Miang.

She graduated from Massachusetts Institute Technology with a Bachelor of Science degree in Economics. She worked as a research assistant at the International Monetary Fund, and as an investment banker at JPMorgan, Goldman Sachs and Citigroup.

Ng took up photography in 2010. She photographs and creates videos of nature. Her images are currently represented by Foto Relevancegallery in Houston, Texas, with her debut solo show "Interludes" in 2021. She was recently interviewed by BBC World Service’s Cultural Frontline on “Creativity and Mental Health” and is a regular contributor to ELEMENTS landscape photography magazine.
