= Lakshmi Vilas Bank =

Indian bank

- Type: Public
- Traded as: BSE: 534690; NSE: LAKSHVILAS
- Industry: Banking; Financial services
- Founded: 3 November 1926; 100 years ago in Karur, India
- Defunct: 27 November 2020; 5 years ago
- Fate: Merged with DBS Bank India Ltd
- Successor: DBS Bank India Ltd
- Headquarters: Chennai, India
- Area served: India
- Key people: Subramanian Sundar (MD & CEO)
- Products: Commercial banking; Financial services; Insurance; Investment banking; Mortgage loans; Private banking; Retail banking; Wealth management
- Revenue: ▼₹2,558.03 crore (US$270 million) (2020)
- Operating income: ▼₹−15.46 crore (US$−1.7 million) (2020)
- Net income: ▲₹−836.04 crore (US$−89 million) (2020)
- Total assets: ▼₹24,421.51 crore (US$2.6 billion) (2020)
- Number of employees: 4349 (2020)
- Capital ratio: -0.88% (2020)
- Website: www.lvbank.com

Lakshmi Vilas Bank was an Indian private sector bank established in 1926 in Karur, Tamil Nadu. As of November 2020, the bank had 566 branches in 19 states and 1 union territory. On 27 November 2020, the bank was merged into the Indian subsidiary of DBS Bank.

== History ==
Lakshmi Vilas Bank was founded in 1926 by a group of seven businessmen of Karur under the leadership of V. S. N. Ramalinga Chettiar. Their objective was to cater to the financial needs of people in and around Karur who were occupied in trading businesses, industry and agriculture. The bank was incorporated on 3 November 1926 under the Indian Companies Act, 1913, and obtained the certificate to commence business on 10 November 1926. Subsequent to the introduction of the Banking Regulations Act, 1949 and the Reserve Bank of India as the regulator for the banking sector, the bank obtained its banking license from RBI on 19 June 1958, and on 11 August 1958 it became a 'scheduled commercial bank' signifying the capability to operate as a full-fledged commercial bank.

Lakshmi Vilas Bank saw considerable expansion of its branch network during the period of 1961 to 1965, when the bank took over nine other banks. In 1974, the bank started expanding the branch network beyond Tamil Nadu to benefit from opportunities in the pan-Indian market. Thus, branches were established in the neighbouring states of Andhra Pradesh, Karnataka and Kerala, important financial centres such as Mumbai, New Delhi and Kolkata as well as in other significant business centres in Maharashtra, Gujarat and Madhya Pradesh. Meanwhile, the bank attained the status of Authorized Dealer in foreign exchange in 1976 enabling it to provide full range of services to customers engaged in international trade and to overseas travellers. Mechanization was introduced in the Administrative Office as early as 1977, and data processing and computerization began in right earnest in 1993 by the bank's own in-house team. Implementation of Core Banking Solution (CBS) was started in October 2006, and all of the bank's branches were migrated to CBS by March 2008.

On 5 April 2019, the board of Lakshmi Vilas Bank approved a merger of the bank with the country's second largest housing finance company, Indiabulls Housing Finance Ltd. Indiabulls shareholders will receive a 90.5% stake in the consolidated entity, to be called Indiabulls Lakshmi Vilas Bank, and LVB will receive the remaining 9.5%. The merged entity will create a net worth of ₹19,472 crore and a loan book ₹1,23,393 crore for the nine months of FY1920. However, the plan was discarded after RBI refused to give approval.

== Moratorium ==
On 17 November 2020, the Reserve Bank of India imposed a month long moratorium on Lakshmi Vilas Bank due to a "serious deterioration" in the company's financial position. Reserve Bank of India issued a notification vide which it declared that the financial position of Lakshmi Vilas Bank is not sufficient to pay off its depositors and a month moratorium was announced under which depositors are able to withdraw a limited amount of money. "The financial position of Lakshmi Vilas Bank Ltd has undergone a steady decline with the bank incurring losses over the last three years, eroding its net-worth. The absence of any viable strategic plan, declining advances and mounting non-performing assets (NPAs), the losses are expected to continue," the RBI said. On the same day, RBI presented a draft amalgamation scheme of LVB with DBS Bank India Limited; the merger would result in a subsequent write-off of paid-up share capital and delisting of LVB from all stock exchanges.

The moratorium was lifted and all branches of LVB started operating as branches of DBS Bank India from 27 November 2020. In addition, RBI asked the bank to write down around ₹316.80 crores of Tier-II bonds.

== See also ==
- Banking in India
- List of banks in India
- Indian Financial System Code
- List of companies of India
