= Bishan =

Bishan may refer to:

== Places ==
=== Singapore ===
- Bishan, Singapore
  - Bishan MRT station, a MRT interchange station along the North South line and the Circle line
    - Bishan tunnel flooding, a major incident in 2017 that occurred near the station
    - Bishan Depot, a MRT train depot located near the station
  - Bishan Bus Interchange, a bus station in Bishan
  - Bishan Public Library, a public library in Bishan
  - Bishan Sports Hall, a sports complex in Bishan
  - Bishan Stadium, a multi-purpose stadium in Bishan
  - Bishan-Ang Mo Kio Park, a neighbourhood park in Bishan
  - Bishan East, a subzone within Bishan
  - Bishan otter family, a family of smooth-coated otters residing in Bishan
- Bishan–Toa Payoh Group Representation Constituency, an electoral constituency in Singapore
  - Bishan Park, a park in Singapore

=== China ===
- Bishan District, a district located west of Chongqing, China
  - Bishan railway station, a railway station within Bishan on the Chengyu Passenger Railway
  - Bishan station (Chongqing Rail Transit), a metro station located in Bishan
- Bishan Temple, a temple located in Shanxi, China

=== Other countries ===
- Bisahan, Jhajjar (or Bishan), a village in the Jhajjar district of Haryana, India
- Bishan Khedi, a village in the Bhopal district of Madhya Pradesh, India
- Bishan Daur, a village in the Punjab province of Pakistan

== People ==
- Bishan Singh (1672–1699), ruler of Amber and head of the Kachwaha Rajput clan from 1688 to 1699
- Bishan Singh Bedi (born 1946), Indian cricketer
- Bishan Singh Chuphal, Indian politician
- Bishan Narayan Dar (1864–1916), Indian politician
- Bishanchander Seth, Indian politician

== See also ==
- Gishan, Hormozgan, also known as "Bīshān Takht", a village in Hormozgan Province, Iran
- Bishan station (disambiguation)
- Bishen (disambiguation)
- Vishnu (disambiguation), etymon of the Indian given name
