= Bishan East =

Coordinates: 1°20′59.35″N 103°51′10.88″E

- Subzone of Bishan Planning Area

Other transcription(s)
  - Chinese: 碧山东
- Interactive map of Bishan East
- Country: Singapore
- Region: Central Region
- Planning Area: Bishan

Population (2025)
  - Total: 27,270

Bishan East (Chinese: 碧山东) is a subzone within the planning area of Bishan, Singapore, as defined by the Urban Redevelopment Authority (URA). Its boundary is made up of Ang Mo Kio Avenue 1 in the north; Bishan Road in the west; Braddell Road in the south; and the Central Expressway (CTE) in the east.

Bishan East is where the town centre of Bishan New Town is located. Landmarks in the subzone include Bishan MRT station, Bishan Bus Interchange, Bishan Stadium, Bishan Public Library, Bishan Community Club and Junction 8.
