= Bishan Public Library =

Public library in Singapore

Coordinates: 1°20′59.42″N 103°50′55.86″E

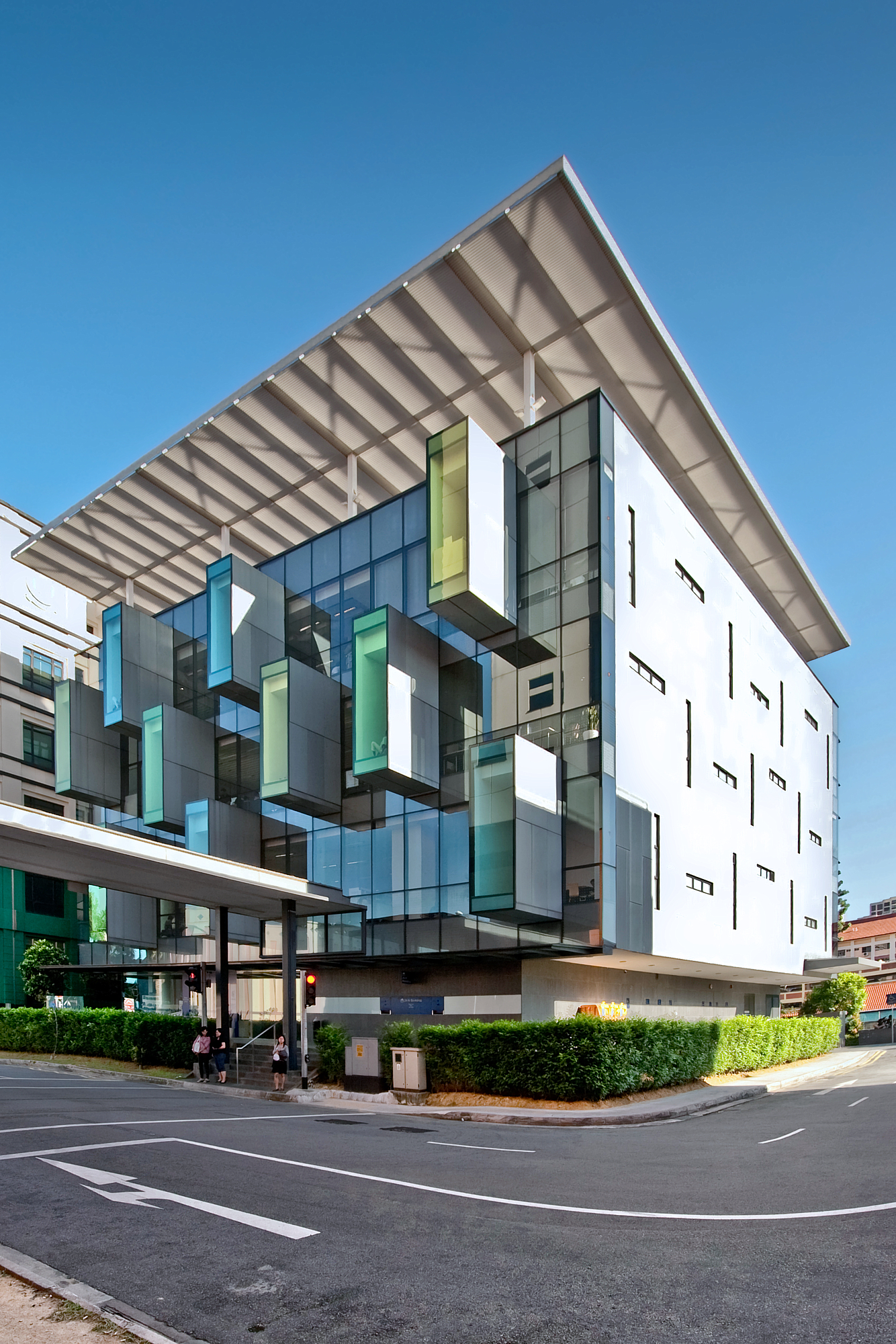
- The Bishan Community Library
- Location: 5 Bishan Place, Singapore 579841, Singapore
- Type: Public library
- Established: 1 September 2006; 19 years ago
- Branch of: National Library Board

Collection
- Size: 250,000
- Public transit access: NS17 CC15 Bishan, Bishan Bus Interchange

The Bishan Public Library is a library in the National Library Board network situated at Bishan, Singapore just behind Junction 8 Shopping Centre. It opened on 1 September 2006 by Deputy Prime Minister, Wong Kan Seng.

== History ==
The library was conceived in the late 1990s because of high traffic in the Toa Payoh Community Library and Ang Mo Kio Community Library. Plans for the library commenced in 2002, and construction took place from 2003 to 2006 at a cost of about S$10 million. Designed by Look Boon Gee, it has about 250,000 titles spread over four floors and a basement, with a Café Galilee on the first floor. Windows that protrude out of the building are actually reading "pods", for readers who want to read quietly or use their laptops there.

The design of the library won a number of awards for its architecture, locally and internationally. The awards won include the President's Design Award in 2007 and the International Architecture Award in 2009.

== Accessibility ==
The library serves a population of around 90,000 in the Bishan area, including the needs of several nearby schools such as Catholic High School, Guangyang Secondary School, Kuo Chuan Presbyterian Secondary School, Whitley Secondary School, Raffles Institution and Raffles Junior College.

It is easily accessible to residents of Bishan via the buses which ply to and from Bishan Bus Interchange. However, library users have to walk a short distance to access the library. The library is also a short walk away from the Bishan MRT station.
