= Gishan =

Gishan (Persian: گيشان) may refer to the following places in Iran:

- Gishan-e Gharbi, Hormozgan Province
- Gishan, Hormozgan, Hormozgan Province
- Gishan, Sistan and Baluchestan, a location in Sistan and Baluchestan Province
