= Bishan station =

Bishan station usually refers to a train station named Bishan located in either Singapore or China.

Bishan station can refer to:

== Singapore ==
- Bishan MRT station, a metro station in Bishan, Singapore

== China ==
- Bishan station (Chongqing Rail Transit), a metro station in Chongqing, China
- Bishan railway station, a railway station in Chongqing, China

== See also ==
- Bishan (disambiguation)
