= Vishnu (disambiguation) =

Vishnu is a god in Hinduism.

Vishnu may also refer to:

- Vishnu (1995 film), a 1995 Tamil film directed by S. A. Chandrasekar
- Vishnu (2003 film), a 2003 Telugu action romance film by Shaaji Kailas
- Vishnu (band), a Norwegian alternative rock band established in 2003

== People with the given name ==
- Vishnu (TV actor), Indian television actor
- Vishnu Raj Atreya (1944–2020), Nepalese writer
- Vishnu Vishal (born 1984), Indian actor in Tamil cinema
- Vishnu Manchu (born 1981), Indian actor in Telugu cinema
- Vishnu Unnikrishnan (born 1987), Indian actor and screenwriter in Malayalam cinema
- Vishnuvardhan (actor) (1950–2009), Indian actor in Kannada cinema
- Vishnuvardhan (director), Indian director in Tamil cinema
- Sree Vishnu (born 1984), Indian actor in Telugu cinema

== See also ==
- Vishnu, fictional villain in the 2011 Indian film Force, played by Vidyut Jamwal
- Vishnu Springs, Illinois, a ghost town in the United States
- Vishnu Basement Rocks, Precambrian rock unit exposed in Grand Canyon
- Vishnu Temple (Grand Canyon), a summit in the Grand Canyon
- Bishan (disambiguation)
- Bishen (disambiguation)
- Vaishnavi (disambiguation)
