= Kwong Wai Siew Peck San Theng =

Columbarium in Singapore

Coordinates: 1.3459°N 103.8428°E

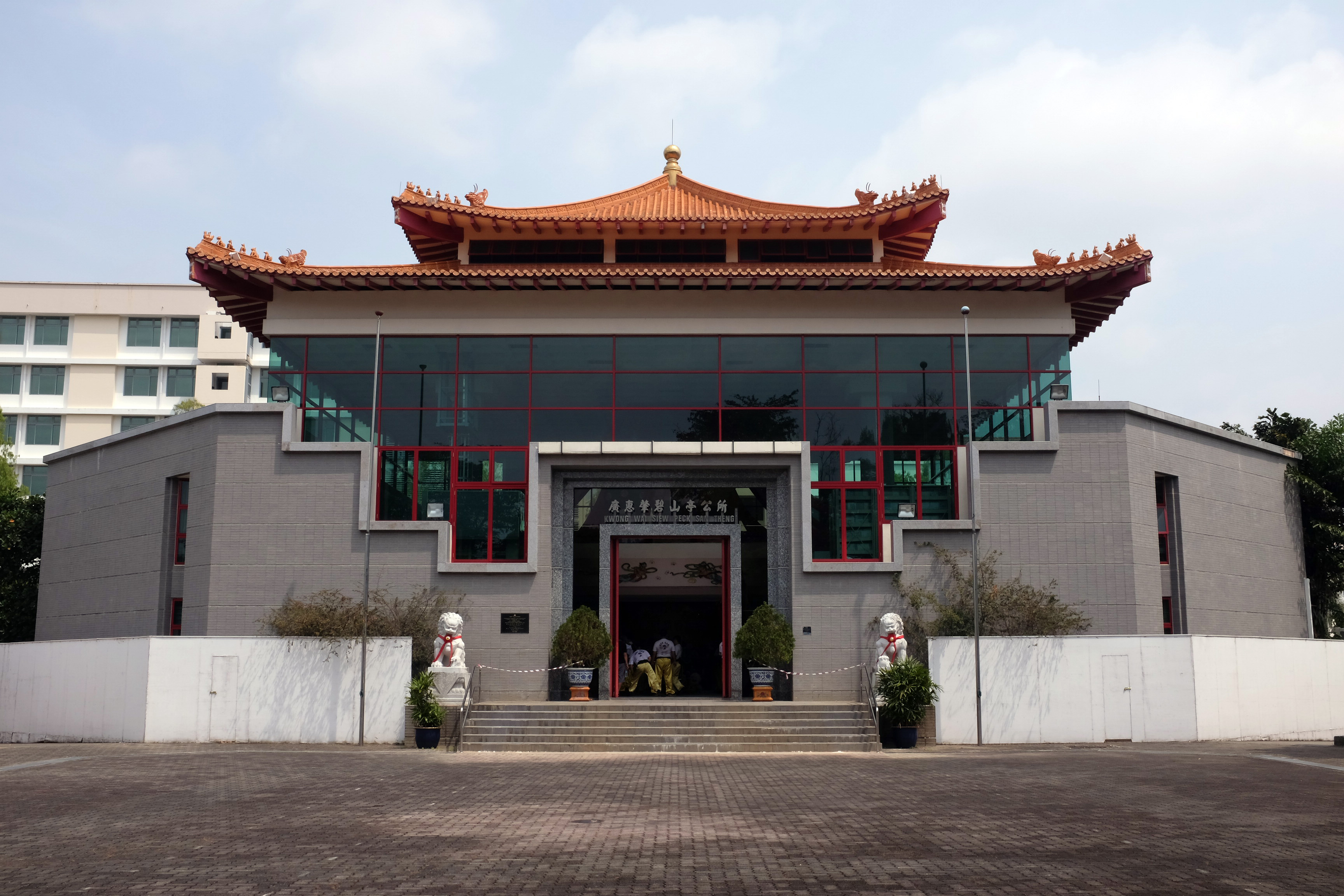
- Traditional Chinese: 廣惠肇碧山亭
- Simplified Chinese: 广惠肇碧山亭
Transcriptions
Standard Mandarin
- Hanyu Pinyin: Guǎng huì zhào bìshāntíng
Yue: Cantonese
- Yale Romanization: gwóng waih siuh bīk sāan tìhng
- Jyutping: gwong2 wai6 siu6 bik1 saan1 ting4

Singapore Kwong Wai Siew Peck San Theng is a cultural organisation and columbarium based in Bishan, Singapore with beginnings since 1870. Located at Bishan Lane off Bishan Road, Peck San Theng presently operates a columbarium, two Chinese temples, and ancestral worship services tailoring towards the requirements as well as traditions, customs and beliefs of a cosmopolitan community. It is currently managed by 16 Cantonese and Hakka clan associations.

== History ==
Kwong Wai Siew Peck San Theng was originally a cemetery in Singapore that was established in 1870 by Cantonese and Hakka immigrants largely from the three prefectures of Guangzhou, Huizhou and Zhaoqing in Guangdong, China. The first words of the three prefectures, Guang-Hui-Zhao were the origins of the name 廣惠肇, or transliterated as Kwong-Wai-Siew. Within a century, Peck San Theng (PST) became one of the biggest Chinese cemeteries in Singapore, holding more than 100,000 graves over 324 acres (1.31 km^{2}) of land.

The earliest known graves in the cemetery was marked 1830 and 1831 and a collective grave marked 1873 for immigrants without descendants from the three prefectures. Other associations and clans started creating collective graves at the cemetery. A stone stele marked 1890 stated that “a temple was built in the burial ground, roads were paved and a cemetery organization was founded in this year.”

In 1916, an organization was created which consisted of nine regional associations to manage PST. Seven other Hakka and Cantonese regional associations later joined PST, making a total of 16 communities managing PST.

In 1922, PST built a Peck Shan temple dedicated to Goddess of Mercy and also stablished a Chinese primary school for local Chinese children.

In 1954, to avoid conflicts among the 16 associations, an 18-member governing committee with two representatives from the original 9 associations was set up to manage PST.

In 1979, the Singapore government decided to acquire all its land to create the present-day Bishan Town. Many graves were exhumed and remains cremated during the 1980s. To enable Peck San Theng to continue with its tradition, the government leased 8 acres (32,000 m^{2}) of land to Peck San Theng for accommodating an office block, two temples and a columbarium. The columbarium houses some 100,000 niches which are available to the public irrespective of race, language and religion since 1980. It continues to be a place for ancestral worship in Singapore. Peck San Teng also provides financial support to the Kwong Wai Shiu Hospital, a charitable organisation that provides healthcare and hospice services to the aged and needy.

In 2018, a heritage gallery was built in Kwong Wai Siew Peck San Theng to illustrate the story of Kampong San Teng.

== Present Day ==
Peck San Theng is currently managed by a federation of 16 clans of the Cantonese and Hakka communities in Singapore.

- Nam Sun (南顺会馆)
- Ning Yeung (宁阳会馆)
- Chung Shan (中山会馆)
- Poon Yue (番禺会馆)
- Fa Yun (花县会馆)
- Kong Chow (冈州会馆)
- Sam Sui (三水会馆)
- Tung On (东安会馆)
- Shun Tak (顺德会馆)
- Ching Yuen (清远会馆)
- Chen Loong (增龙会馆)
- Wui Chiu (惠州会馆)
- Siu Heng (肇庆会馆)
- Koh Yiu (高要会馆)
- Hok San (鹤山会馆)
- Yen Peng (恩平会馆)

== Grand Universal Salvation Ritual ==
Grand Universal Salvation Ritual (万缘胜会) was first introduced to Peck San Theng in 1921. The ritual was organised irregularly and was organised when there is a need for the ritual and raise funds. The grand ritual is usually collectively conducted by a group of Buddhist monks and nuns and a troupe of Taoist priests. The spiritual significance of this ritual is about preserving and promoting important family value like filial piety.
