= Marymount, Singapore =

Coordinates: 1.3539°N 103.8368°E

Marymount
- Subzone of Bishan Planning Area

Other transcription(s)
  - Chinese: 玛丽蒙
  - Tamil: மேரிமவுண்ட்
- Interactive map of Marymount
- Country: Singapore
- Region: Central Region
- Planning Area: Bishan

Area
  - Total: 1.96 km^{2} (0.76 sq mi)

Population (2026)
  - Total: 28,370
  - Density: 14,500/km^{2} (37,500/sq mi)

Marymount (Chinese: 玛丽蒙, Tamil: மேரிமவுண்ட்) is a subzone within the planning area of Bishan, Singapore. Its boundary is made up of Ang Mo Kio Avenue 1 in Ang Mo Kio in the north, Bishan Road in the east, Braddell Road in the south and Marymount Road in the west.

== Etymology ==
The area takes its name from the Marymount Convent School, which in turn was named Mary, the mother of Jesus.
