= Bishan Khedi =

- village
- Location within Madhya Pradesh Location within India
- Coordinates: 23.3230949°N 77.3697672°E
- Country: India
- State: Madhya Pradesh
- District: Bhopal
- Tehsil: Huzur
- Elevation: 500 m (1,600 ft)

Population (2011)
  - Total: 726
- Time zone: UTC+5:30 (IST)
- ISO 3166 code: MP-IN
- 2011 census code: 482364

Bishan Kheda is a village in the Bhopal district of Madhya Pradesh, India. It is located in the Huzur tehsil and the Phanda block.

== Demographics ==
According to the 2011 census of India, Bishan Khedi has 146 households. The effective literacy rate (i.e. the literacy rate of population excluding children aged 6 and below) is 69.77%.

Demographics (2011 Census)
	Total	Male	Female
Population	726	356	370
Children aged below 6 years	104	48	56
Scheduled caste	299	141	158
Scheduled tribe	0	0	0
Literates	434	241	193
Workers (all)	357	203	154
Main workers (total)	199	171	28
Main workers: Cultivators	76	71	5
Main workers: Agricultural labourers	103	88	15
Main workers: Household industry workers	0	0	0
Main workers: Other	20	12	8
Marginal workers (total)	158	32	126
Marginal workers: Cultivators	35	5	30
Marginal workers: Agricultural labourers	121	27	94
Marginal workers: Household industry workers	2	0	2
Marginal workers: Others	0	0	0
Non-workers	369	153	216
