= Gishan-e Gharbi =

Gishan-e Gharbi گيشان غربي
- Village
- Location within Iran
- Coordinates: 27°40′35″N 56°14′06″E
- Country: Iran
- Province: Hormozgan
- County: Bandar Abbas
- Bakhsh: Fin
- Rural District: Gohreh

Population (2006)
  - Total: 44
- Time zone: UTC+3:30 (IRST)
  - Summer (DST): UTC+4:30 (IRDT)

Gishan-e Gharbi (Persian: گيشان غربي, also Romanized as Gīshān-e Gharbī; also known as Gīshān) is a village in Gohreh Rural District, Fin District, Bandar Abbas County, Hormozgan Province, Iran. At the 2006 census, its population was 44, in 24 families.
