= Bishen =

Bishen may refer to:

- Bishen, Iran, a village in Hamadan Province, Iran
- Bishen Bedi (born 1946), former Indian cricketer

== See also ==
- Bishan (disambiguation)
- Bi Sheng (972–1051 AD), Chinese artisan and inventor
