= Gishan, Hormozgan =

Gishan گيشان
- Village
- Location within Iran
- Coordinates: 27°32′35″N 56°34′54″E
- Country: Iran
- Province: Hormozgan
- County: Bandar Abbas
- Bakhsh: Takht
- Rural District: Takht

Population (2006)
  - Total: 131
- Time zone: UTC+3:30 (IRST)
  - Summer (DST): UTC+4:30 (IRDT)

Gishan (Persian: گيشان, also Romanized as Gīshān; also known as Bīshān Takht, Gīshān-e Sharqī, and Gīshān Takht) is a village in Takht Rural District, Takht District, Bandar Abbas County, Hormozgan Province, Iran. At the 2006 census, its population was 131, in 36 families.
