= Bishan Stadium =

Multi-purpose stadium in Bishan, Singapore

- Stadium Bishan (Malay) 碧山体育场 (Chinese) பிஷன் ஸ்டேடியம் (Tamil)
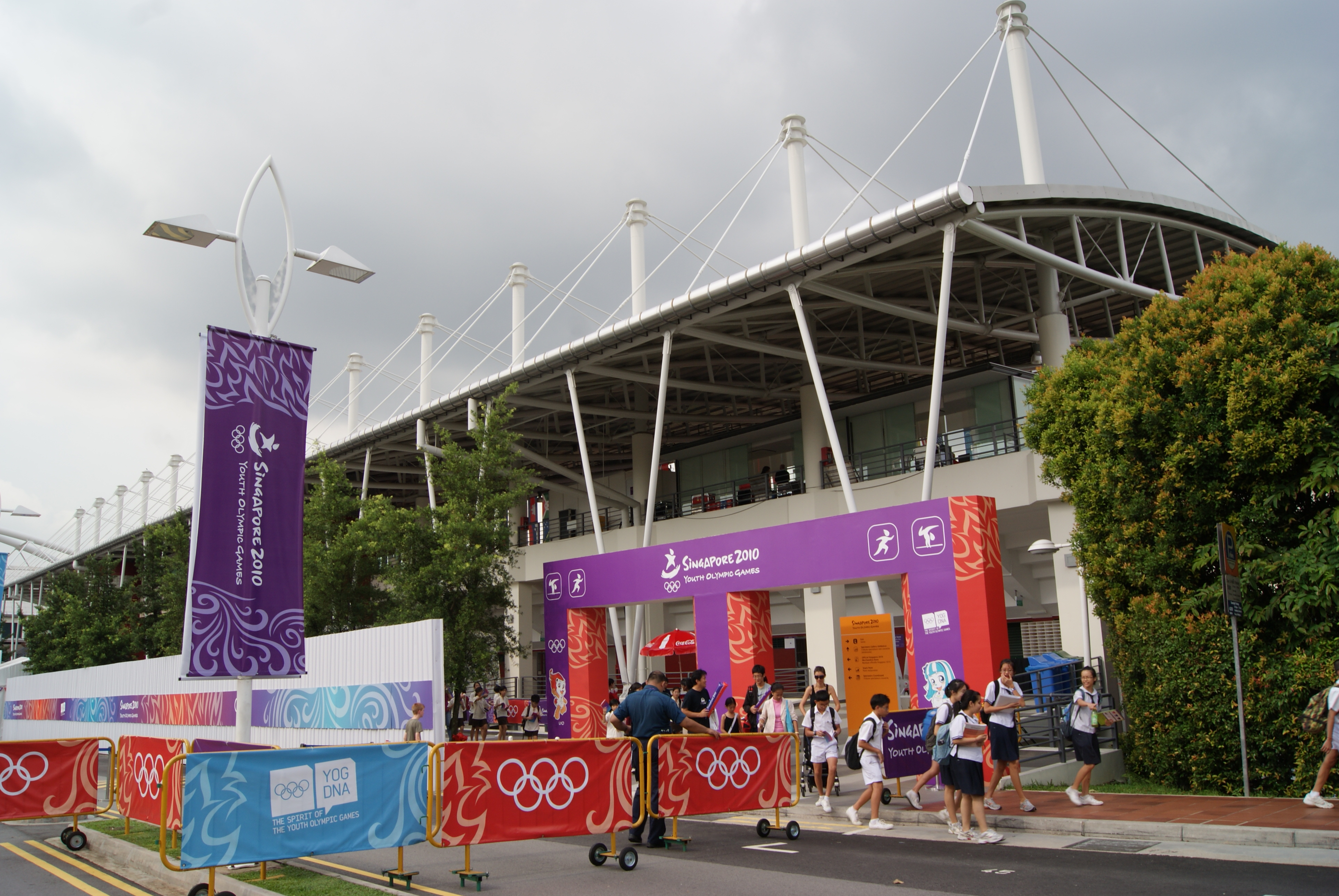
- Bishan Stadium during the 2010 Summer Youth Olympics
- Interactive map of Bishan Stadium
- Full name: Bishan ActiveSG Stadium
- Address: Bishan
- Location: 7 Bishan Street 14, Singapore 579784
- Coordinates: 1°21′16.36″N 103°51′5.31″E
- Owner: Sport Singapore
- Operator: Sport Singapore
- Capacity: 6,254 (original); 10,000 (maximum)
- Surface: Grass
- Record attendance: 9,737 (Lion City Sailors vs Sharjah, 18 May 2025)
- Field size: 100 m × 64 m (328 ft × 210 ft)
- Public transit: NS17 CC15 Bishan

Construction
- Opened: 1 April 1998; 28 years ago
- Renovated: 2009, 2025

Tenants
- Lion City Sailors (1998–2019; 2023–present); Balestier Khalsa (2024–present); Lion City Sailors FC (women)

Website
- www.myactivesg.com/Facilities/bishan-stadium

Bishan Stadium is a multi-purpose stadium in Bishan, Singapore. It is the main home ground of Singapore Premier League side Lion City Sailors, and used mostly for football matches. The stadium was constructed in 1998 and is managed by Sport Singapore. The stadium is also third-in-line to host international football matches, behind the Singapore National Stadium and Jalan Besar Stadium.

== History ==
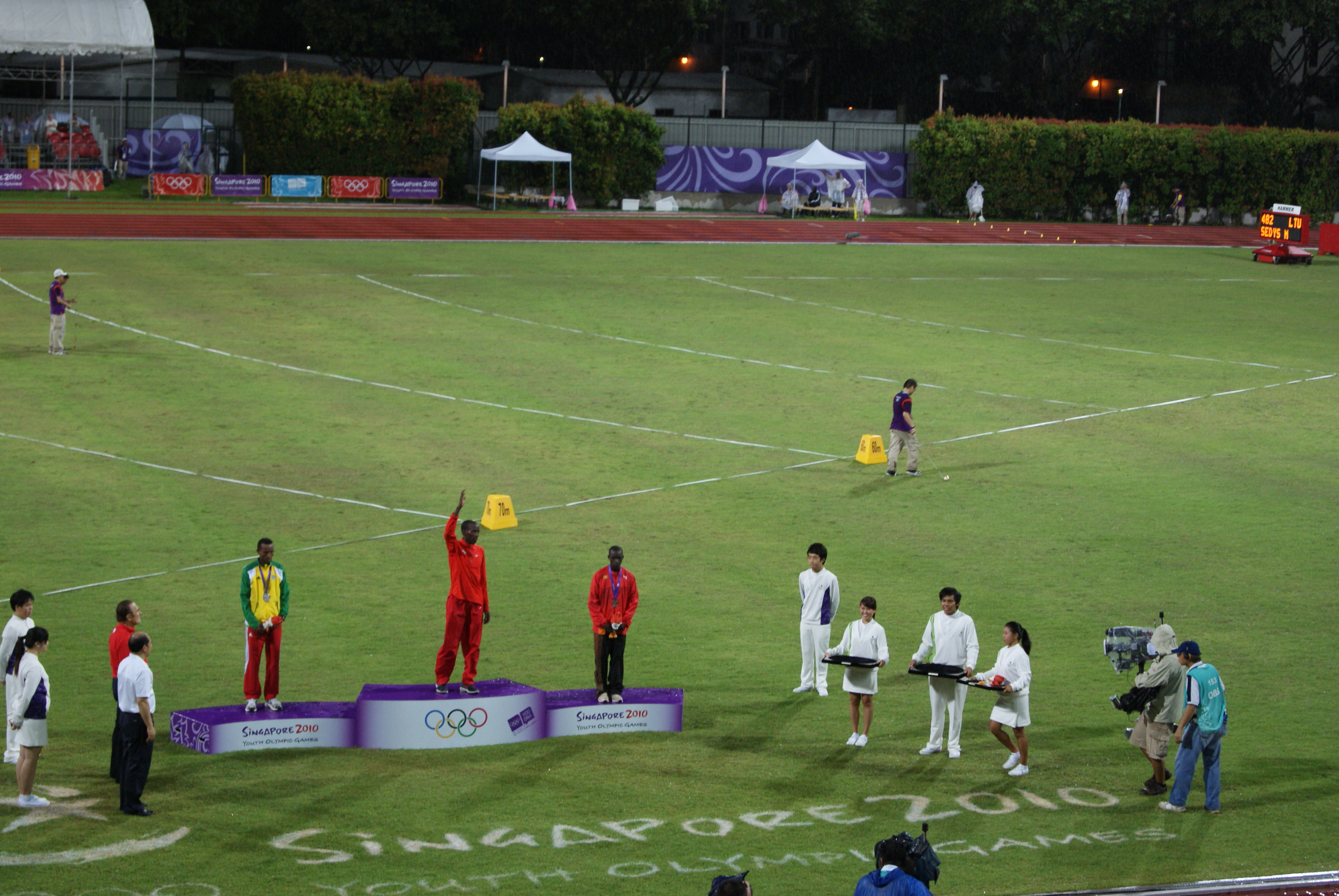
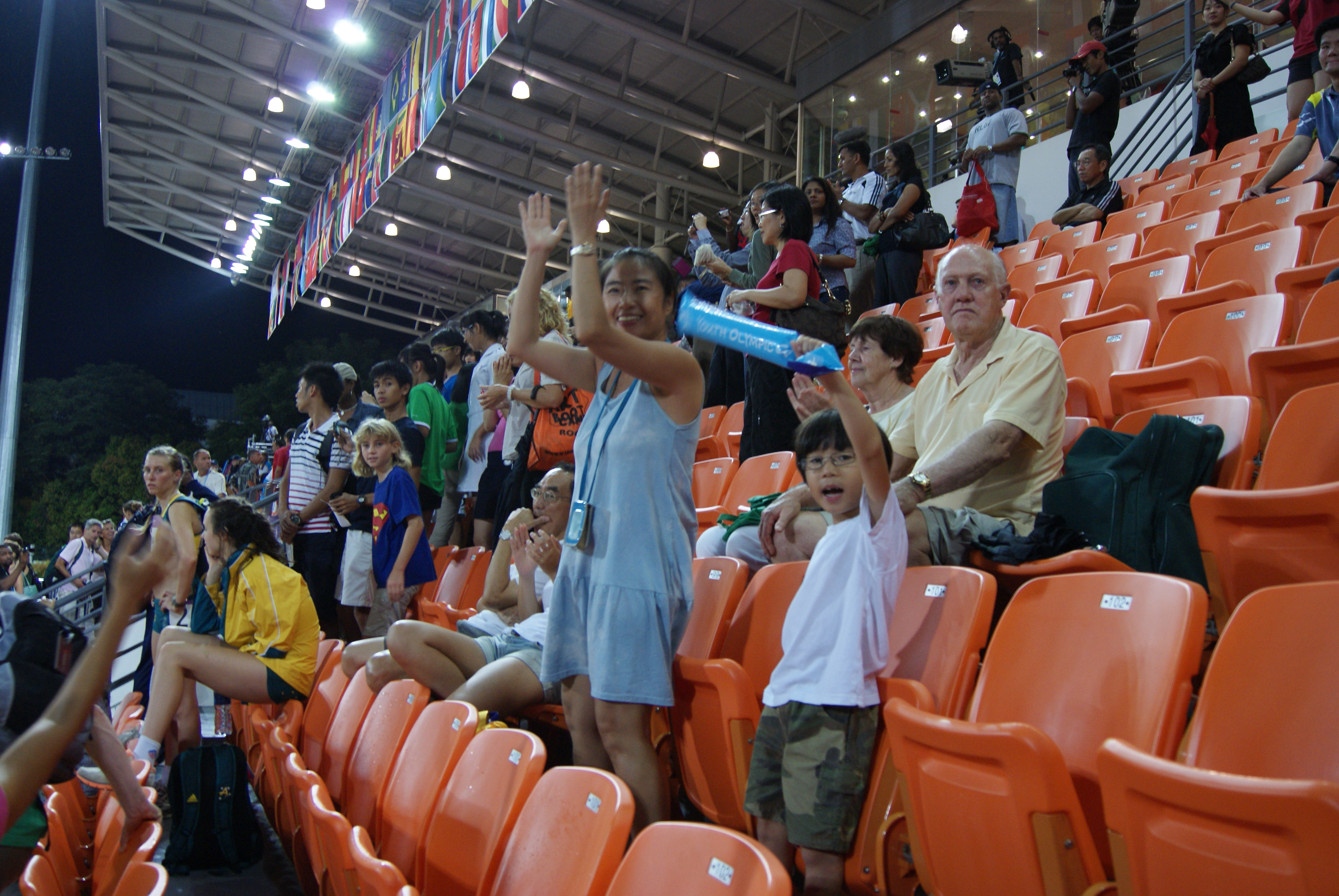
Bishan Stadium was the venue for the athletics competitions during the 2010 Summer Youth Olympics.

=== Timeline ===
Since its opening in 1998, the stadium has served as the home ground of professional football club Home United, which was renamed to Lion City Sailors in 2020. It has also hosted several regional and international football events, including AFC Cup matches from 2004 to 2006 and the 2006 AFC U-17 Championship. It has also been used as a training base by various national and international teams, including Australia (2007 AFC Asian Cup), Japan (2018 FIFA World Cup qualification), Argentina national football team (2017 international friendly against Singapore), South Korea (2026 FIFA World Cup qualification), as well as clubs such as Juventus (2019 International Champions Cup), Sanfrecce Hiroshima and Sydney FC (2024–25 AFC Champions League Two).

In addition to football, Bishan Stadium has hosted athletics competitions such as the 35th Singapore Junior Athletics Championships in 2009 and served as the athletics venue for the 2009 Asian Youth Games and the 2010 Summer Youth Olympics. During the 2015 Southeast Asian Games, the stadium was used for group-stage football matches. It also hosted international friendlies in 2018, with Singapore playing against Mauritius and Fiji. Following the 2020 Singapore Premier League season, the pitch underwent a returfing exercise.

Lion City Sailors returned to the stadium for the 2023 Singapore Premier League season after a two-year hiatus. In June 2024, the stadium was used by the South Korea national team in preparation for their 2026 FIFA World Cup qualification. In March and April 2025, it served as a training venue for Sanfrecce Hiroshima and Sydney FC ahead of their AFC Champions League Two knockout matches. Bishan Stadium hosted the 2025 AFC Champions League Two final between Lion City Sailors and Sharjah FC, with its seating capacity temporarily increased to 10,000 for the event.

== Location ==
Situated in the central part of Singapore, Bishan Stadium is part of the Bishan Sports and Recreation Centre, which includes the Bishan Sports Hall and the Bishan Swimming Complex. The stadium is also a 20 minute drive away from the Lion City Sailors Training Centre located in Mattar Road.

== Facilities and structures ==
Bishan Stadium is a public sport stadium operated by Sport Singapore. Other than the football pitch, Bishan Stadium houses 1 8 lane running track, 4 long jump pits, 2 high jump pits, 1 seating gallery and 1 portable seating gallery.

In preparation for the 2025 AFC Champions League Two final, temporary stands – the North, South and East stands were built. Together with the original West stand, the stadium held up to 10,000 spectators. An onsite medical room, rooms for the AFC's technical officials and working committee were set up at the stadium. On top of which, an upgraded press conference room, media tribune and media centre were installed.

== Major club matches ==
=== AFC Champions League Two final ===
AFC Champions League Two final
Season	Date	Winners	Score	Runners-up	Attendance
2024–25	18 May 2025	(United Arab Emirates) Sharjah	2–1	(Singapore) Lion City Sailors	9,737

== International fixtures ==
Date	Competition	Team	Score	Team
28 October 2000	Friendly	Singapore	4–0	Sri Lanka
22 May 2001	Friendly	Singapore	3–0	New Zealand
16 September 2003	Friendly	Singapore	1–3	Oman
31 December 2009	Friendly	Singapore	1–4	Oman
13 November 2016	Friendly	Singapore	1–0	Cambodia
7 September 2018	Friendly	Singapore	1–1	Mauritius
11 September 2018	Friendly	Singapore	2–0	Fiji
12 October 2018	Friendly	Singapore	2–0	Mongolia
8 September 2023	Friendly	Singapore	0–2	Tajikistan
12 September 2023	Friendly	Singapore	3–1	Chinese Taipei
5 June 2025	Friendly	Singapore	3–1	Maldives

=== 2020 AFF Championship ===
Date	Team	Score	Team	Attendance
6 December 2021	Cambodia	1–3	Malaysia	518
6 December 2021	Laos	0–2	Vietnam	812
9 December 2021	Malaysia	4–0	Laos	427
9 December 2021	Indonesia	4–2	Cambodia	500
12 December 2021	Laos	1–5	Indonesia	207
12 December 2021	Vietnam	3–0	Malaysia	976
15 December 2021	Cambodia	3–0	Laos	129
15 December 2021	Indonesia	0–0	Vietnam	928
18 December 2021	Myanmar	2–3	Philippines	215
19 December 2021	Vietnam	4–0	Cambodia	909

== Other sporting events ==
- AFC Cup group stage: 2004, 2005, 2006
- AFC U-17 Asian Cup: 2006
- Singapore Junior Athletics Championships: 2009
- 2010 Summer Youth Olympics: Athletics
- 2015 SEA Games - Football Group B
- ASEAN Championship group stage: 2020
- AFC Champions League Two final: 2025
- AFC Champions League Two group stage: 2025-26
- 2027 AFC U-17 Women's Asian Cup qualification: Group B

== Transport ==
=== Mass Rapid Transit (MRT) ===
The stadium is located near Bishan MRT station on the North-South line and the Circle line.

=== Bus ===
Buses 53, 410G/W, which are run by SBS Transit arrives at the bus stop outside the stadium.

== See also ==
- List of stadiums in Singapore
