= Bishan Bus Interchange =

Bus interchange in Singapore

Bishan Bus Interchange 碧山巴士转换站 Pusat Pertukaran Bas Bishan
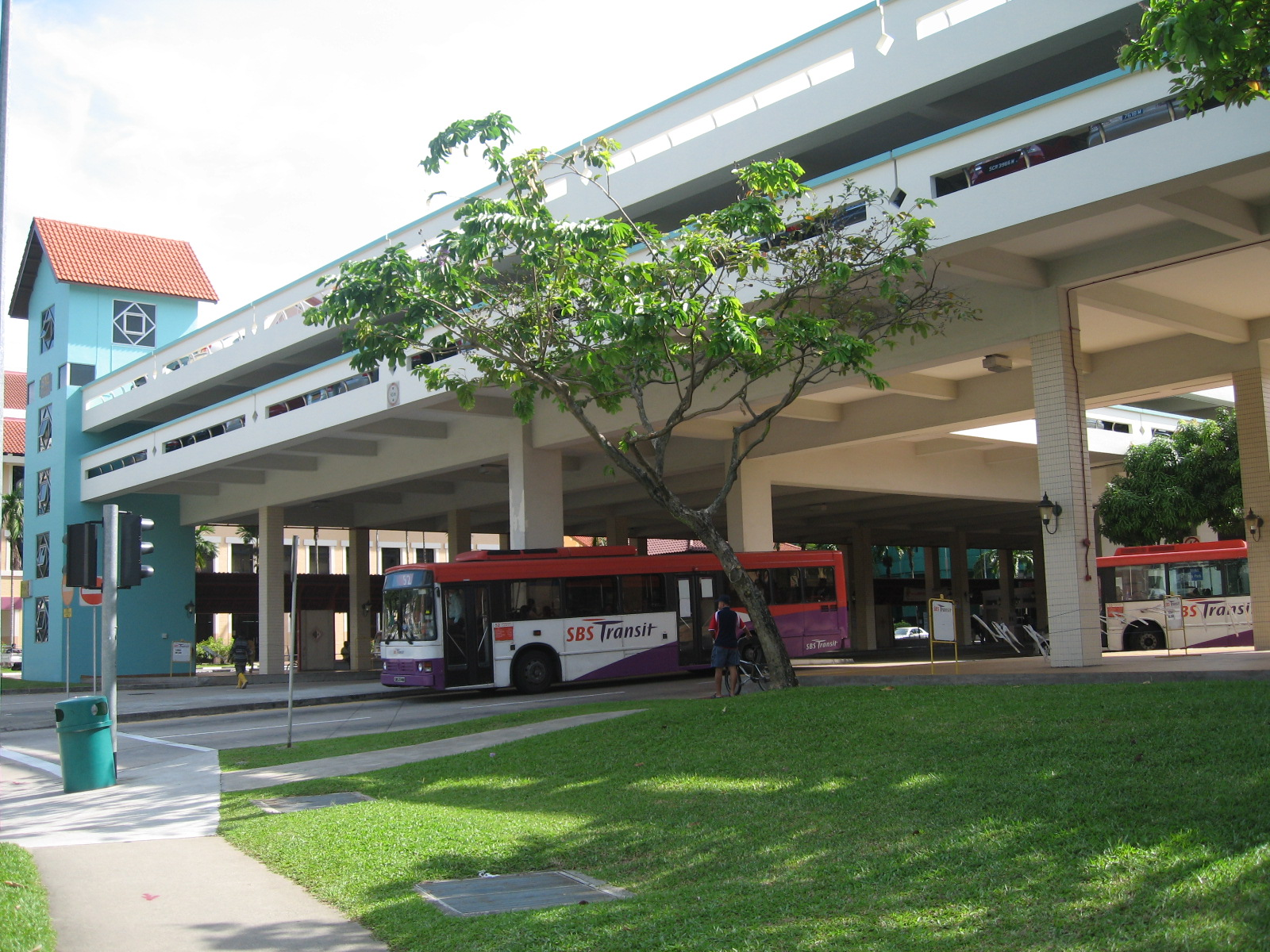
- Bishan Bus Interchange, the upper floors are home to a hawker centre and a multi-storey car park.

General information
- Location: 514 Bishan Street 13, Singapore 570514
- Coordinates: 1°21′1″N 103°50′59″E
- System: Public Bus Interchange
- Owner: Land Transport Authority
- Operator: SBS Transit (ComfortDelGro)
- Bus routes: 10 (SBS Transit)
- Bus stands: 4 boarding berths 2 alighting berths
- Bus operators: SBS Transit
- Connections: NS17 CC15 Bishan

Construction
- Structure type: At-grade
- Accessible: Accessible alighting/boarding points Accessible public toilets Graduated kerb edges Tactile guidance system

History
- Opened: 30 April 1989; 37 years ago

Key dates
- 30 April 1989: Commenced operations
Location

Bishan Bus Interchange is a bus interchange serving Bishan, Singapore. The interchange commenced passenger service as Bishan Bus Terminal in 1988, with Services 56 and 58. Located at Bishan Street 13, it is designed in a unique squarish configuration with the building wrapping around the bus parking area.

The Ministry of Education Language Centre (MOELC) lies across the field to the north. Passengers are also able to transfer to Bishan MRT station on the Circle line from an entrance located right outside the interchange.

== History ==
Bishan Bus Interchange opened on 30 April 1989. Built at a cost of SGD$5.5 million, it replaced the temporary bus station that had been serving the new town of Bishan since December 1985. It was among the first batch of bus interchanges built to integrate with a Mass Rapid Transit (MRT) station. As such, passengers can easily transfer between bus services at this interchange and the Bishan MRT station.

== Design ==
The unusual design of Bishan Bus Interchange was previously described in The New Paper as "a piece of Disneyland in Bishan". The interchange features a castle-like structure wrapping around the bus parking area. Above the interchange, there is a cafeteria as well as a car park. A children's playground and an adjoining structure that houses a coffee shop (taken over a McDonald’s branch) were also constructed together with this interchange.

Bishan Bus Interchange is physically linked to the neighbouring Junction 8 and to Bishan MRT station.

== Facilities ==
Bishan Bus Interchange used to feature a fast food restaurant, being the first bus interchange in Singapore to have this facility. It also features a children's playground, which was designed to complement the fast food restaurant to make the bus interchange family-friendly.

The bus interchange also houses a 560-lot car park above its premises, similar in design to Bukit Batok Bus Interchange.

== Bus contracting model ==
Under the bus contracting model, all bus services operating from Bishan Bus Interchange were divided into three bus packages, operated by the anchor operator, SBS Transit, until June 2027. From then, 4 bus services will be operated by SMRT Buses as it takes over operations of the Serangoon-Eunos bus package.

=== List of bus services ===
Operator	Package	Routes
SBS Transit	Bishan-Toa Payoh	50, 52, 54, 56, 410G, 410W
SBS Transit	Bukit Merah	57
SBS Transit	Serangoon-Eunos	53, 55, 55B, 58, 59 (until June 2027)
SMRT Buses	Serangoon-Eunos	53, 55, 55B, 58, 59 (from June 2027)

== Redevelopment ==
As part of URA's Draft Masterplan 2025, the current bus interchange at Bishan is planned to be redeveloped with air-conditioned waiting area.
