= Bishan MRT station =

Mass Rapid Transit station in Singapore

Bishan NS17 CC15 碧山 பீஷான்
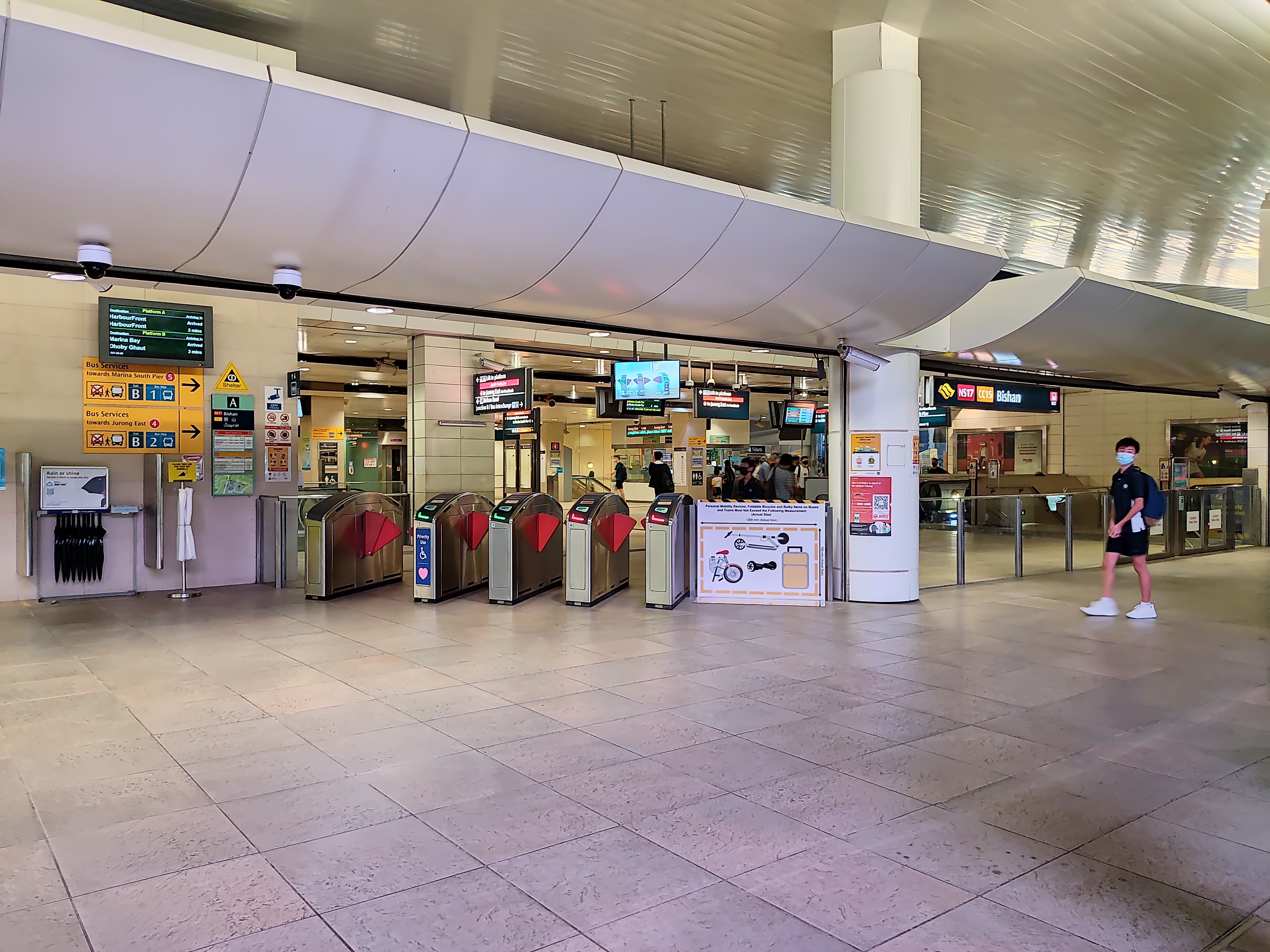
- Exit A of Bishan station

General information
- Location: 200 Bishan Road, Singapore 579827 (NSL); 17 Bishan Place, Singapore 579842 (CCL)
- Coordinates: 01°21′04″N 103°50′54″E
- System: Mass Rapid Transit (MRT) interchange
- Owner: Land Transport Authority
- Operator: SMRT Trains
- Line: North–South Line Circle Line
- Platforms: 4 (1 island platform, 2 side platforms)
- Tracks: 4
- Connections: Bishan, Taxi

Construction
- Structure type: Subsurface (North–South Line); Underground (Circle Line)
- Platform levels: 2
- Parking: Yes (Junction 8)
- Cycle facilities: Yes
- Accessible: Yes

Other information
- Station code: BSH

History
- Opened: 7 November 1987; 39 years ago (North–South Line); 28 May 2009; 17 years ago (Circle Line)
- Rebuilt: 27 July 2008; 18 years ago (North–South Line southbound platforms); 22 May 2009; 17 years ago (North–South Line northbound platforms)
- Former names: Kampong San Teng, San Teng

Passengers
- June 2024: 37,275 per day

Services
Preceding station	Mass Rapid Transit	Following station
Ang Mo Kio towards Jurong East	North–South Line	Braddell towards Marina South Pier
Lorong Chuan Clockwise	Circle Line	Marymount Anticlockwise
Lorong Chuan towards Dhoby Ghaut	Circle Line	Marymount towards Prince Edward Road
Track layout
Location
- Location within Singapore Rail central area

Bishan MRT station (/ˈbiːʃɑːn/ BEE-shahn) is a Mass Rapid Transit (MRT) interchange station on the North–South (NSL) and Circle (CCL) lines in Bishan, Singapore. The station is located along Bishan Road within the town centre; it is close to Junction 8 shopping centre, Bishan Bus Interchange and Bishan Stadium. Nearby schools include Raffles Institution, Catholic High School and Kuo Chuan Presbyterian Secondary School.

Initially announced as Kampong San Teng, it was renamed San Teng and subsequently Bishan. The NSL station opened on 7 November 1987; it was one of the first five stations on the MRT network. The NSL station was originally constructed with an island platform. During the construction of the CCL station, the NSL station was upgraded to cope with increased passenger traffic from the CCL, which included construction of a brand new side platform to serve southbound trains, while the original island platform was converted to a side platform to serve only northbound trains. The CCL station opened on 28 May 2009.

Bishan's NSL platforms are the only ground-level station on the MRT network, while the CCL station features Move! by Soh Ee Shaun, an Art-in-Transit artwork. Owing to its location as the site of a former cemetery that was cleared for construction, the station is also associated with local folklore claiming it to be haunted.

== History ==
=== North–South Line (1987) ===
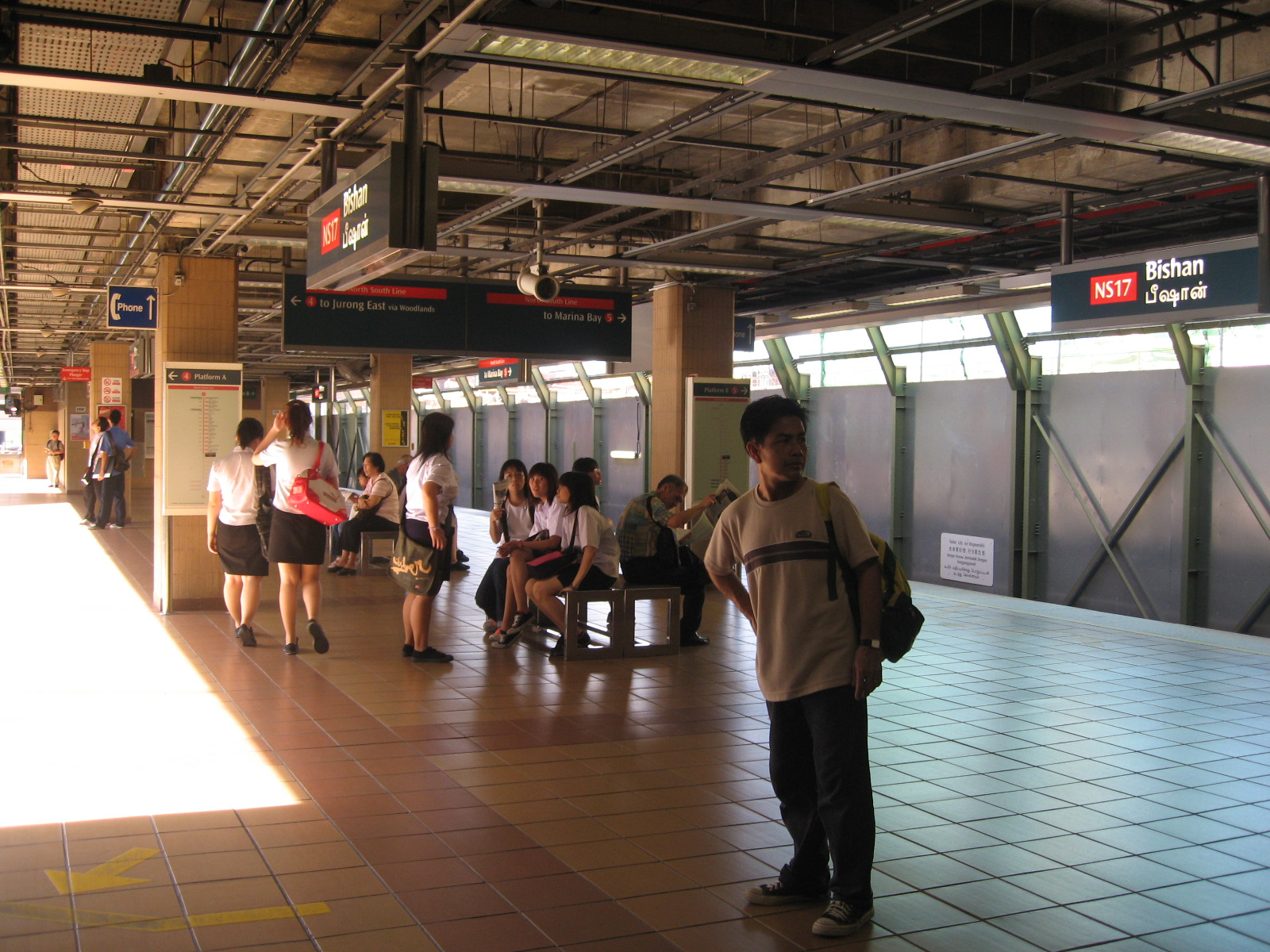
Original island platform in 2006

The refurbished platform serving only northbound trains since 2008.

Bishan station, then named Kampung San Teng, was one of the first stations to be included in the planning stages of the MRT network. The station was renamed San Teng in November 1982, and would be built at a Chinese cemetery. Contract 103 for the construction of San Teng MRT station and 3.2-kilometre (2.0-mile) of tunnels between San Teng and Braddell stations was awarded to a Belgian–Singaporean joint venture Hytech, Franki and Compagnie Francois d'Enterprises in December 1983 at a contract sum of S$32.88 million (US$15.56 million). This was the first contract involving a cut and cover construction method which the MRT Corporation (MRTC) awarded. On 21 September 1984, the MRTC renamed San Teng to Bishan station to reflect the name of the new public housing estate that was being built around the station's site.

Structural works for Bishan station was completed on 23 October 1985. In January 1986, it was announced the station would be opened in early 1988 as part of the first section of the MRT system from Yio Chu Kang to Toa Payoh. In September 1987, it was announced the section would open on 7 November that year. To familiarise people with the system, the station opened for a preview from 24 to 25 October. As announced, Bishan was one of the first MRT stations on the network to be opened for service on 7 November 1987.

=== Circle MRT line and further upgrades (2008–09) ===
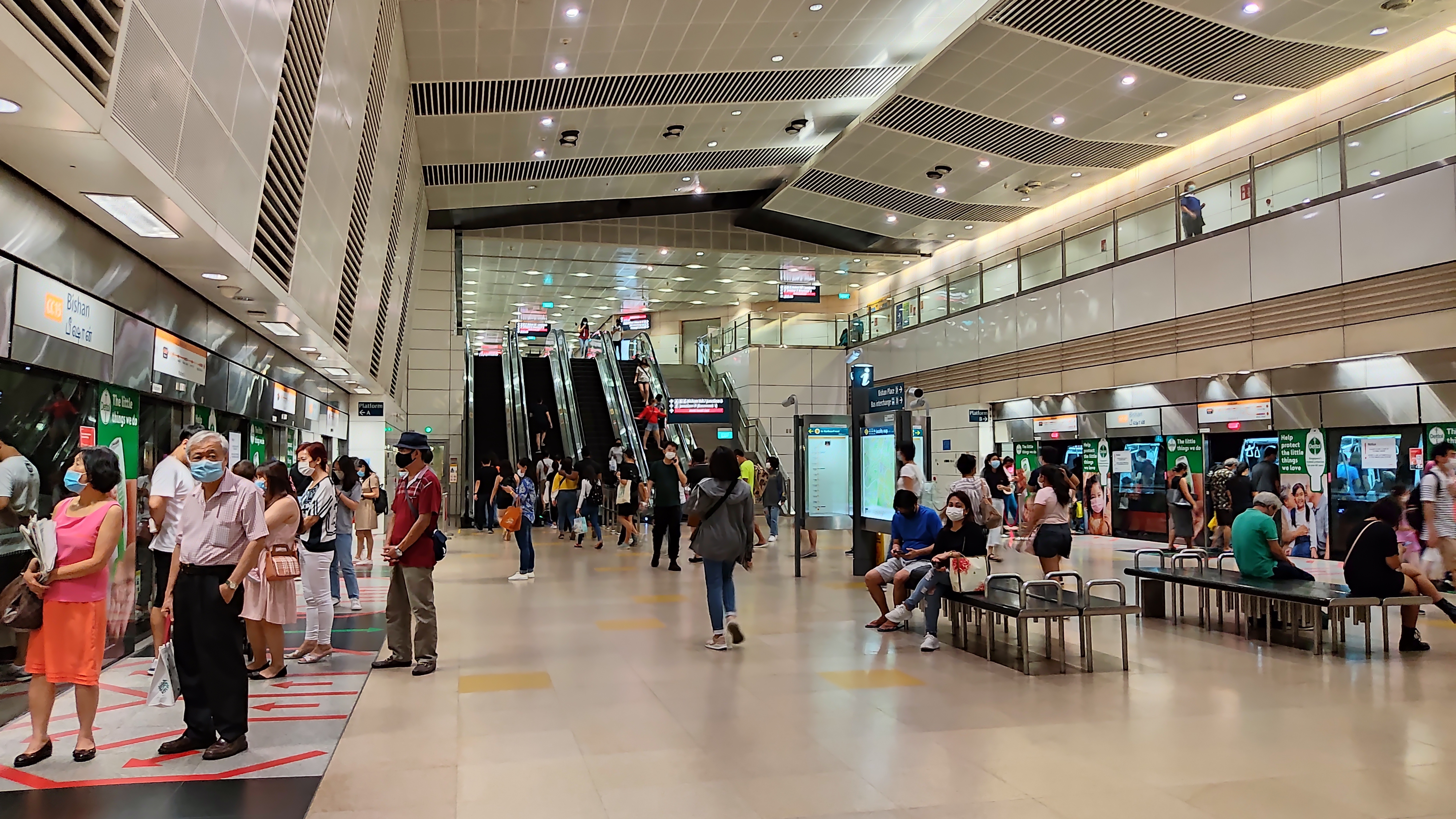
CCL platforms of Bishan station

In July 2003, Contract C825A for the design, construction and completion of Bishan interchange station was awarded to Econ Corporation Ltd and Eng Lim Construction Co Pte Ltd Joint Venture at a sum of S$82.2 million (US$47.18 million). The contract also included the upgrading of the NSL station. Construction was due to start in the third quarter of 2003 and was expected to be completed by early 2008.

The original NSL station underwent major alterations to enable it to accommodate increased passenger traffic when the CCL station opened. An air-conditioned platform to serve southbound trains was constructed to increase the station's passenger capacity from 1,250 to 2,020. The new platform, Platform B, opened for service on 27 July 2008. Because Platform A, the original platform, was now serving northbound trains to Jurong East and remained in service, upgrading works for Platform A were hindered and took about a year to complete. While the platform was re-tiled during the day, platform screen doors (PSDs) were installed in sections through the night. An air-conditioning system was also installed as part of the upgrade. Upgrading work for the platform was completed on 23 May 2009. An additional entrance to the basement of Junction 8 was also built. Along with the other Stage 3 CCL stations, Bishan CCL station was opened on 28th of that month.

Due to the close proximity of a nearby tunnel portal to residential apartment blocks, the installation of 2-metre (6 ft 7 in)-tall barriers stretching 180 metres (590 ft 7 in) started in September 2011 and was completed by the second quarter of 2012. These barriers are insulated with noise-absorptive materials such as rock wool, which helped reduce noise volume by about five decibels. The NSL station underwent another upgrade in 2016; this included the repositioning of seats on the platforms to allow more space and seats for commuters to be added.

=== Bishan tunnel flood ===
On 7 October 2017, during heavy rain in the afternoon, water entered a section of tunnel between Bishan and Braddell MRT stations, disrupting NSL train services from Ang Mo Kio station to Marina South Pier for several hours. This was the first time train services in Singapore were affected by flooded tunnels. Separately, at about 5.55 pm, a small fire ignited in the tunnel between Marina Bay and Raffles Place stations but it is not clear the fire, which was extinguished by itself, was linked to the flood, although electrical short circuits caused by water had previously caused tunnel fires. Train services between Marina South Pier and Newton resumed at about 9.20 pm that day. After the Singapore Civil Defence Force (SCDF) worked overnight to clear the water in the tunnels, train services between Newton and Ang Mo Kio stations resumed at 1.36 pm the following day. This train disruption was one of the worst in SMRT's history. Through investigations by the Land Transport Authority (LTA), it was discovered the overflowing in the tunnel was caused by a malfunction in the poorly maintained water pumping system, which was repaired. On 20 July 2018, the Land Transport Authority fined the operator a combined S$1.9 million (US$1.41 million) for this incident, in addition to the Pasir Ris rail accident, and subsequently sacked eight workers involved in the incident due to their negligence by falsifying maintenance records and not maintaining the pumps.

== Station details ==
=== Location and name ===
Bishan MRT station is located along Bishan Road in the new town of the same name. The name Bishan itself is the Mandarin pronunciation of the Cantonese Peck San (Chinese: 碧山; pinyin: Bìshān), which was derived from the name of the large Cantonese and Hakka burial ground that used to cover the area.

Bishan station is situated near the retail development Junction 8 and other public amenities such as Bishan Public Library, the CPF Bishan Service Centre, Bishan Neighbourhood Police Post, Bishan Stadium, Bishan Community Club and Bishan Bus Interchange. It is within walking distance of Catholic High School, Raffles Institution, Kuo Chuan Presbyterian School and the Ministry of Education Language Centre (Bishan).

==== Services ====
Bishan station serves the North–South (NSL) and Circle lines (CCL). The station codes are NS17 (formerly N8) and CC15 according to official maps. On the NSL, Bishan station is located between Ang Mo Kio and Braddell stations, while on the CCL, the station is located between Lorong Chuan and Marymount stations. The NSL has headways of two to five minutes while the CCL services have headways of three-and-a-half to five minutes.

=== Station design ===
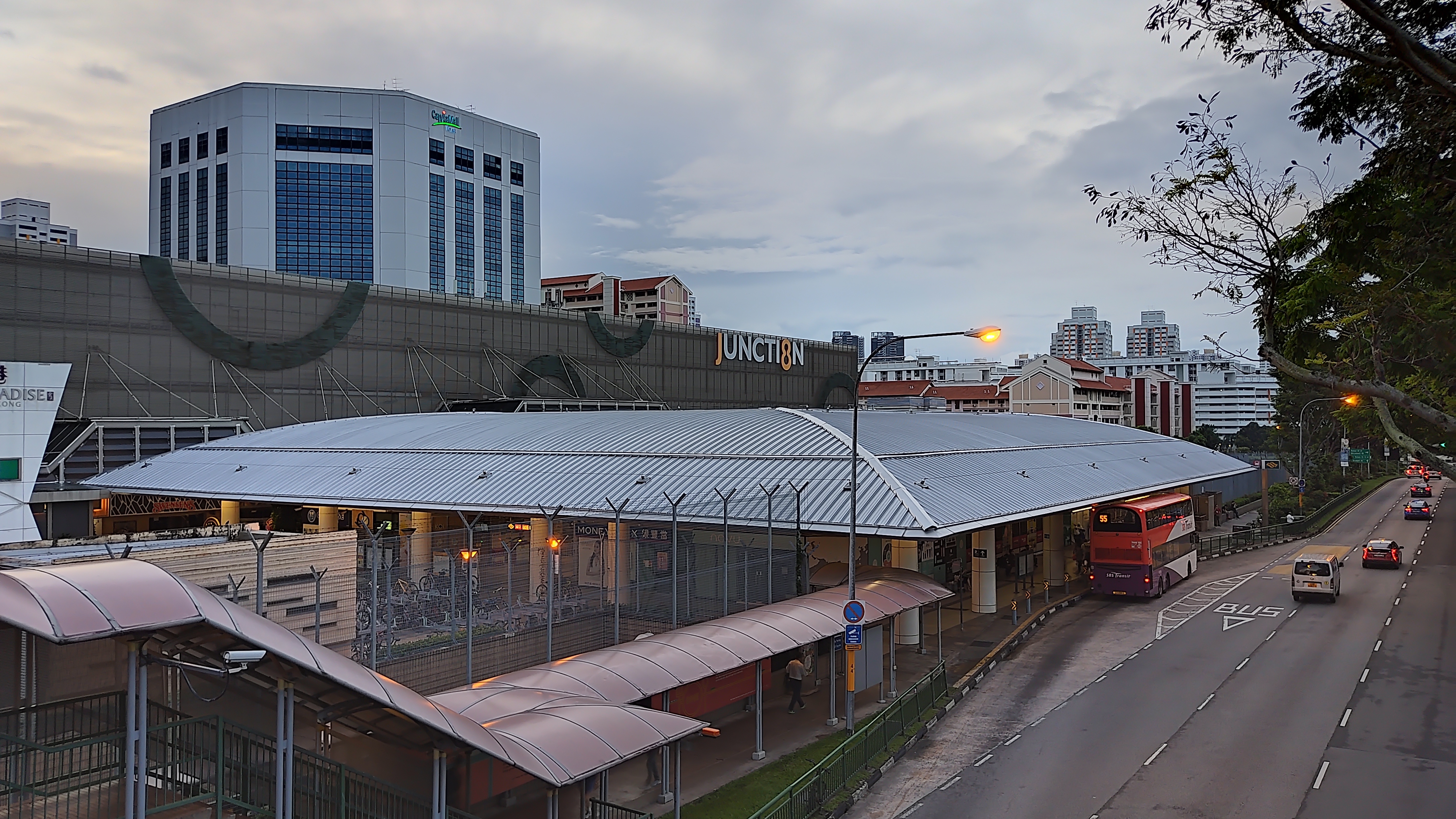
The entrance in front of the Junction 8 shopping mall

Bishan NSL station is the only ground-level station on the MRT network. The station was designed with an "open, sunken-plaza" concept that allows natural light onto the tracks. The station has a beige and brick-coloured scheme with plantings of bougainvillaeas outside. The station concourse has steel roof cladding that was installed by Robertson Building Systems (RBS) for S$20 million (US$9.09 million). During construction of the CCL, the station entrance was upgraded to "capture the essence" of the station's status as "gateway" to Bishan. The rebuilt station has a pyramidal opened-top aluminium roof over the existing flat roof, allowing sunlight and ventilation into the station.

The retail stores around the station use glass panels that have chamfered corners, giving balance to the roof. The glass walls are separated from the roofline via a small space at the top so the roof appears to be afloat. The paid area has a layered ceiling and design elements made of glass, giving it a spacious atmosphere. A glass canopy connects the station to the retail development Junction 8.

Bishan CCL station is one of eleven stations along the Circle Line that are designated as Civil Defence (CD) shelters that can be activated during national emergencies. The designated stations have reinforced construction, and are designed and equipped with facilities including protective blast doors, decontamination facilities, ventilation systems, power and water supply systems, and a dry toilet system to ensure the environment is tolerable if the station is used as a shelter.

== Public artworks ==
Three artworks are displayed in this station – two as part of the Art in Transit programme, (Note: Public art showcase which integrates artworks into the MRT network.) and the other part of SMRT's Comic Connect. (Note: A heritage-themed public art display.)

=== Move! ===
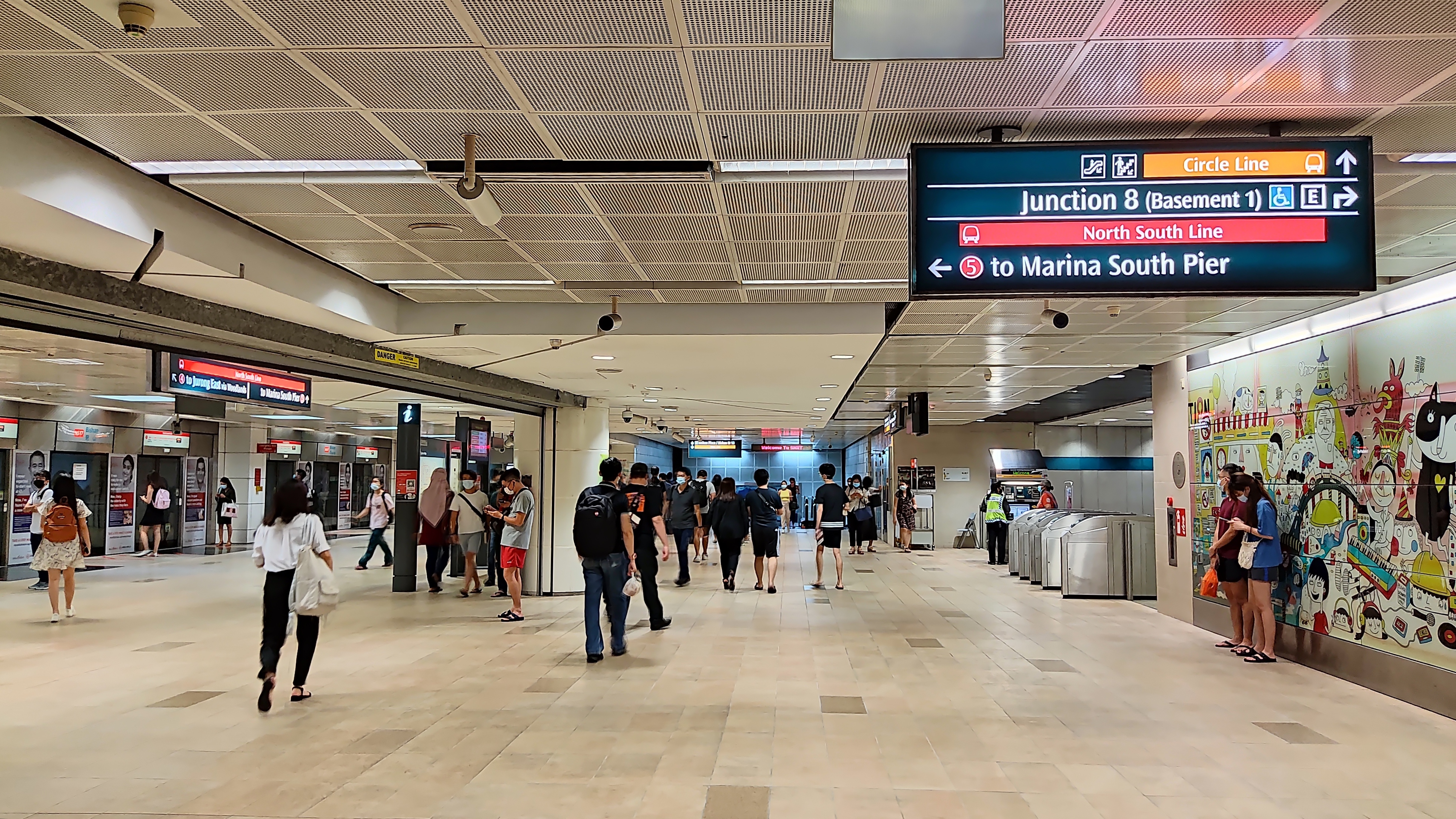
One of the murals of Move! along the station's passageway to the CCL

The artwork Move! by Soh Ee Shaun is displayed at the CCL station as part of the network's Art-in-Transit programme. The artwork consists of three murals – "The Family", "The Scientist" and "The Heartland" – each of which is made of 16 glass panels, all cast in film. The artwork reflects the artist's view of the "mindless rush of commuters" through the station. "The Family", a 3-by-8.7-metre (9.8 by 28.5 ft) mural mainly in yellow and black, depicts ordinary activities that are part of Singapore's "air-conditioned" lifestyle. "The Scientist" portrays larger-than-life scientists surrounded by modern technology such as rockets, robots and fighter jets; this mural is designed in blue and black and is painted on a 3-by-7.2-metre (9.8 by 23.6 ft) canvas. "The Heartland", on a 2.9-by-8.2-metre (9.5 by 26.9 ft) panel, represents the neighbourhood of Bishan with the area's notable landmarks against a pink backdrop. While these works cover different subject matters, all express the artist's "silly and illogical" style.

The youngest to be commissioned for an Art-in-Transit artwork on the CCL, Soh initially planned to create an abstract work of people moving around to reflect the bustle of a train station. However, it was thought to be "too literal" and the Art-in-Transit curator Karen Lim, urged Soh to incorporate thematic stories. Soh initially drew up murals centred on general life in Singapore – Garden Circus, The Control Room and The Living Room – the latter two developing into The Scientist and The Family respectively. Garden Circus, which illustrated the "pace of life" in Singapore, was withdrawn as it was considered "not strong enough conceptually". Soh found inspiration for The Heartland on another visit to Bishan. He went on to draft and incorporate elements that he considered timeless so that his work would remain relevant throughout time. Lim also advised Soh to "tone down" his murals to avoid the viewers being "drawn away" from the narratives as Soh kept inserting more features and altering the work. The murals were reproduced digitally and enlarged to fit on the walls. Soh inspected the panels and oversaw the installation in the station, working with the station architects and production team. As a tribute, the artist included depictions of workers with construction hats in The Heartland. Soh hoped that the work would "liven up" the plain environment of the station and provide something fresh to the commuters.

=== Art Seats ===
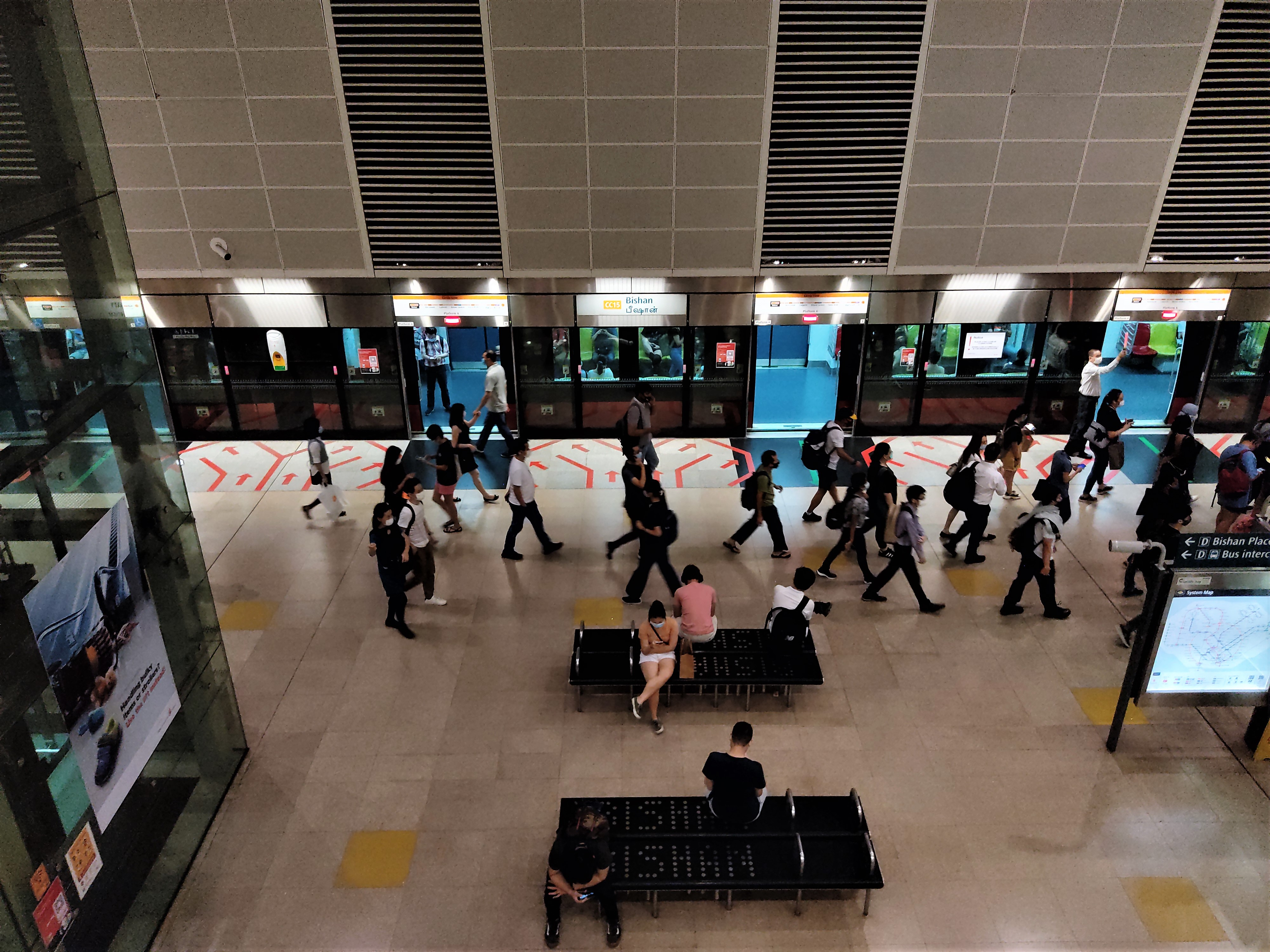
Art Seats Matrix at the CCL platforms

Bishan CCL station includes two sets of Art Seats, which are designed to provide functional pieces of artwork. Two entries, both by Lui Honfay and Yasmine Chan, were selected through the International Art Seats Design Competition in 2006. Matrix, which received the top prize in the international competition, consists of a series of benches engraved on the surface with the station name in a dot-matrix style, which was used because it was flexible enough to be mass-produced for use in many stations.

Rain consists of steel seats in the shape of water puddles in place of the standard stone seats in other MRT stations. The sets' design was intended to include a "natural element in an abstract matter". (Note: These seats are also displayed in the other CCL interchange stations, such as Buona Vista station.)

=== Comic Connect ===
A heritage-themed mural as a part of SMRT's Comic Connect is displayed at this station. Created by local artist David Liew, the mural depicts the history of Bishan, including Kampong San Teng, Peck San Theng Cemetery, the secret societies in the area and festivals that was celebrated at the cemetery.

== Cultural impact ==
As Bishan station is located on the former burial grounds of Peck San Theng, it is rumoured in local folklore to be haunted. Stories of "headless figures" alighting and boarding at the station are widely known, with one version from the 1990s describing a ghost sitting in the last train car holding its severed head on the adjacent seat. Such accounts are believed to have originated from the Kwong Wai Siew Peck San Theng columbarium, which today houses about 45,000 urns, according to Singapore Paranormal Investigators (SPI). In response to calls and letters from late night passengers claiming to witness headless ghosts at the station, The New Paper investigated these claims in 1988 but did not find any ghosts. The station's operator MRTC (predecessor to SMRT Trains) has said the operations and their staff have not been impacted by any sightings but confirmed the station is at the site of the former cemetery.

In 2005, The Straits Times revisited the rumours and investigated several ghost sightings at Bishan station, ultimately debunking many of the accounts. One report involved a passenger on a late-night train that did not stop at the station. When the passenger questioned the driver, the driver claimed to have seen more people on the platform than the commuter could, suggesting ghosts. The station operator clarified that trains occasionally bypass stations, but these services are usually empty, and a train might have missed the stop due to a technical fault. The article also cited a first-hand account from a former civil servant who said she fainted aboard a train in 1991, claiming she felt numerous groping hands before losing consciousness after the train departed Bishan station. Despite these accounts, The Straits Times field investigation reported no ghostly encounters.

== Notes and references ==
=== Bibliography ===
- Ng, Yew Peng (2018). What's in the name? How the streets and villages in Singapore got their names. Singapore: World Scientific. ISBN 978-981-322-139-0. OCLC 990571127.
- Savage, Victor (2013). Singapore street names : A study of Toponymics. Singapore: Marshall Cavendish Editions. ISBN 978-981-4408-35-6. OCLC 868957283.
- Zhuang, Justin (2013). Art in transit : Circle Line MRT - Singapore. Singapore: Land Transport Authority. ISBN 978-981-07-4982-8. OCLC 854958677.
- Colin, Cheong (2012). The Circle Line, Linking All Lines. ISBN 978-981-4342-02-5.
