= List of social service agencies in Singapore =

This is a list of social service agencies (SSA) in Singapore.

These agencies are members of the National Council of Social Service (NCSS) in Singapore.

== Legend ==
- Syntax: [[Official NCSS registered name]], date of registration

== A-G ==
- 365 Cancer Prevention Society
- Action for AIDS
- Adventist Community Services
- Adventist Home for the Elders
- Adventist Nursing & Rehabilitation Centre
- Agape Counselling and Training Centre
- Ain Society
- Alexandra Hospital, Medical Social Service
- Allkin Singapore Ltd
- aLife Ltd
- All Saints Home
- Alzheimer's Disease Association
- American Women's Association
- Ang Mo Kio - Thye Hua Kwan Hospital
- Animal Concerns Research and Education Society, 24.5.2001
- Animal Lovers League, 25.3.2002
- Apex Clubs of Singapore
- Apex Day Rehabilitation Centre for Elderly
- Apex Harmony Lodge
- APSN Centre for Adults
- Archdiocesan Commission for the Pastoral Care of Migrants and Itinerant People
- Ark Quest
- Asian Women's Welfare Association
- As-Salaam Family Support Centre
- Assemblies of God Community Services Society
- Assisi Hospice
- Association for Early Childhood Educators
- Association for Person with Special Needs
- Association for Psychiatric Rehabilitation
- Association of Apex Clubs of Singapore
- Association of Muslim Professionals
- Association of Women for Action and Research
- Australian & New Zealand Association
- Autism Association
- Autism Resource Centre
- Avelife Foundation
- Balestier Special School
- Baptist Student Care Centre
- Bartley Community Care Services
- Bethesda Care & Counselling Services Centre
- Bethesda Community Assistance and Relationship Enrichment Centre
- Bethesda Community Services Society
- Beyond Social Services
- Bible-Presbyterian Welfare Services
- Bishan Toa Payoh CCC North Child Care & Delpmt Ctr
- Bizlink Centre Singapore
- Blue Cross Charitable Institution
- Blue Cross Thong Kheng Home
- Bo Tien Home for the Aged
- Bo Tien Welfare Services Society
- Bone Marrow Donor Programme http://bmdp.org/
- Boon Lay Neighbourhood Link
- Boys' Brigade in Singapore
- Boys' Town Singapore
- Breadline Group
- Breakthrough Missions
- Breaking Margins
- Breastfeeding Mothers' Support Group
- Bright Hill Evergreen Home
- Bright Vision Hospital
- Buddha of Medicine Welfare Society
- Buddhist Compassion Relief Tzu Chi Foundation
- Buddhist Culture Centre
- Buddhist Union
- Bukit Ho Swee FSC
- CampusImpact
- Canossian Daughters of Charity
- Care Community Services Society
- Care Corner Child Development Centre
- Care Corner Child Development Centre
- Care Corner Counselling Centre
- Care Corner Family Service Centre
- Care Corner SAC
- Care Corner SAC
- Care Corner Singapore
- Care for the Elderly Foundation
- Care Link
- CareCancer Society
- Caregiving Welfare Association
- Catholic Welfare Services Singapore
- Central Council of Malay Cultural Organisation (Majlis Pusat)
- Central Singapore CDC (SS BoonHua)
- Centre for Exceptional Children
- Centre for Fathering
- Centre for Promoting Alternatives to Violence
- Centre of Activity & Recreation for the Elders
- Cerebral Palsy Alliance Singapore, formerly known as Spastic Children's Association of Singapore
- Charis Centre
- Chen Su Lan Methodist Children's Home
- Chen Su Lan Trust
- Cheng Hong Welfare Service Society
- Cheshire Homes Far Eastern Regional Council
- Children-At-Risk Empowerment Association (CARE Singapore)
- Children's Aid Society
- Children's Cancer Foundation
- Children's Charities Association of Singapore
- Chinese Development Assistance Council
- Chinese Women's Association
- Chong Hua Tong SAC
- Christian Care Services
- Christian Outreach to the Handicapped
- City Harvest Community Services Association
- Club Rainbow (Singapore)
- Coalition Against Bullying for Children & Youth
- Compass Welfare Foundation
- Concern & Care Society
- Cornerstone Community Services Centre
- Cornerstone Life Skills Centre
- Counselling & Care Centre
- Covenant Family Service Centre
- Credit Counselling Singapore Society
- Crime Library
- Daybreak Family Service Centre
- Diabetic Society of Singapore
- Disability Information and Referral Centre
- Disabled People's Association
- Dover Park Hospice
- Down Syndrome Association
- Dreams @ Kolam Ayer
- Dyslexia Association of Singapore
- Eagles Mediation & Counselling Centre
- Eden Community Services Centre
- EN Community Services Society
- Endometriosis Association
- Epworth Community Services
- Eurasian Association Singapore
- Ex-Services Association of Singapore
- Family Life Centre
- Family Life Society
- Federation of Youth Clubs
- Fei Yue Community Services
- Fei Yue Family Service Centre
- Filos Community Services
- Firefly Mission
- Focus on the Family Singapore
- Food from the Heart
- Foundation of Rotary Clubs
- Franciscan Missionaries of Mary
- Friends in Deed Counselling Society
- Gabrielite Centre for School Counselling
- Gerontological Society
- Geylang East Home for the Aged
- Geylang Senior Citizens' Health Care Centre
- Girl Guides Singapore
- Girls' Brigade Singapore
- Glory Centre Community Services Association
- Golden Years Fellowship
- Good News Community Services Centre
- Grace Lodge
- Guide Dogs Singapore

== H-P ==
- Habitat for Humanity Singapore
- Haemophilia Society of Singapore
- Hao Ren Hao Shi Limited
- Handicaps Welfare Association
- Happy Arts Enterprise
- Hariprasad Children Centre
- Hariprasad
- Healthy Aging Association
- Hearty Care Centre
- HELP Family Service Centre
- The Helping Hand (halfway house)
- Hiding Place (Christian Home Mission)
- Highpoint Community Services Association
- Home Nursing Foundation
- Hope Centre
- HOPE Worldwide
- Hospice Care Association
- Hougang Sheng Hong Family Service Centre
- Hua Mei Care Management Service of Tsao Foundation
- Hua Mei Seniors Clinic
- Humanitarian Organization for Migration Economics
- iC2 PrepHouse Limited
- Indus Moral CARE
- Infant Jesus Homes and Children's Centres
- Inner Wheel Club of Singapore
- International Y'S Men's Club of Singapore
- International Nature Loving Association (Singapore), 14.9.2009
- iPaLs
- Islamic Theological Association of Singapore (Pertapis)
- Istavin Dynamics
- Jenaris Home@Pelangi Village
- Jewish Welfare Board
- Jia Ying Community Services Society
- Joy Centre
- Joy Place - Centre for Children w/Special Needs
- Ju Eng Welfare Association
- Junior Chamber of Singapore
- Kallang Bahru Family Service Centre
- Kamala Club
- Kampong Kapor Family Service Centre
- Kampung Senang Charity and Education Foundation, 11.2.1999
- Kang Ming Free Clinic
- Kheng Chiu Loke Tin Kee Home
- Kidney Dialysis Foundation
- King George's Ave SAC
- Kiwanis Club of Singapore
- Kreta Ayer SAC
- Kwan-In Welfare Society
- Kwong Wai Shiu Hospital and Nursing Home
- Lakeside Family Centre
- Leukemia and Lymphoma Foundation
- Life Community Services Society
- Life Spring Community Network
- Light & Love Welfare Services Centre
- Ling Kwang Home for Senior Citizens
- Lioness Club of Singapore
- Lions Befriender Service Association
- Lions Club of Singapore
- Lions Community Service Foundation
- Lions Home for the Elders
- Lotus Light Charity Society (Singapore)
- Loving Heart Multi-Service Centre
- Lutheran Community Care Services
- Macpherson Moral Family Service Centre
- Mainly I Love Kids Fund (MILK)
- Majulah Community
- Make-A-Wish Foundation
- Malay Youth Literary Association (4PM)
- Malay Youth Literary Association (Persatuan Persuratan Pemuda Pemudi Melayu)
- Mamre Oaks Day Activity Centre (Adults with intellectual and developmental disabilities), 2015
- Man Fatt Lam Home for the Aged
- Man Fut Tong Nursing Home
- Man Fut Tong Senior Care Centre
- Marian Centre
- Marine Parade Family Service Centre
- Marine Parade Foo Hai Elderly Lodge
- Marymount Centre
- [[MCYC Community Services Society rebranded to Epworth Community Services]]
- Methodist Hospice Fellowship
- Methodist Welfare Services
- Metropolitan YMCA
- Metta Welfare Association
- Ministry of Community Development & Sports (Social Support Division)
- Moral Family Service Centre
- Moral Home for Disabled Adults
- Moral Neighbourhood Link
- Moral SAC (Toa Payoh)
- Morning Star Community Services
- Movement for the Intellectually Disabled of Singapore
- Muhammadiyah Welfare Home
- Muscular Dystrophy Association of Singapore
- Muslim Kidney Action Association (MKAC)
- Muslim Missionary Society Singapore (Jamiyah)
- Muslim Social Welfare Association of Sembawang
- Muslimin Trust Fund Association (Darul Ihsan)
- Nanyang Technological University Welfare Services club
- National Arthritis Foundation
- National Cancer Centre (Psychosocial Oncology)
- National Kidney Foundation Singapore
- National Safety Council of Singapore
- National St John Council
- National University of Singapore Students' Union
- Neighbour Ring Community Services
- Netherlands Charity Association
- New Hope Community Services
- New Horizon Centre (Loke Yew - Tampines)
- New Horizon Centre (Toa Payoh)
- New Life Community Services Centre
- Ngee Ann Traditional Chinese Medicine Centre
- NTUC Child Care Co-operative (Kim Keat)
- NTUC Child Care Co-operative (Toa Payoh)
- NTUC Eldercare Co-Operative
- Nulife Care & Counselling Services
- O'Joy Care Services
- Oxley Student Care Centre
- Parkinson's Disease Society
- Parkway HealthCare Foundation
- Pasir Panjang Hill Community Services Centre
- Passiton Admin
- Passiton Mobility
- Peace-Connect
- Pertapis Children's Home
- Pertapis Halfway House
- Philippine Bayanihan Society Singapore
- PPIS-Jurong Family Service Centre
- Presbyterian Community Services
- Prison Fellowship Singapore
- Project:Senso Ltd
- Promised Land Missions
- Promisedland Community Services
- Prophet Muhammad's Birthday Memorial Scholarship Fund Board
- Public Free Clinic Society
- Pu Ti Lian She

== Q-S ==
- Queenstown Multi-Service Centre for the Elderly
- Rainbow Centre
- Ramakrishna Mission
- REACH Community Services Society
- Reach Family Service Centre
- Realm of Tranquility
- Red Swastika Charity Foundation
- Ren Ci Hospital and Medicare Centre
- Renewal Self-Development Centre
- Retired & Senior Volunteer Programme
- Riding for the Disabled Association of Singapore
- RiverLife Community Service Centre
- Rochore Kongsi for the Aged
- Rotary Club of Singapore
- Salem Welfare Services
- Salvation Army
- Samaritans of Singapore
- Sanctuary House Limited
- Sathya Sai Social Service
- Save the Children
- Sembawang Tamils' Association
- Serangoon Moral Family Service Centre
- SGRainbow
- Shan You Counselling Centre
- Sian Chay Medical Institution
- Sikh Sewaks Singapore
- Sikh Welfare Council
- Sinda Family Service Centre
- Singapore Action Group of Elders
- Singapore After-Care Association
- Singapore Airport Terminal Services Staff Association
- Singapore Amalgamated Services Co-Operative Organisation Senior Citizens Home
- Singapore American Community Action Council
- Singapore Anglican Community Services
- Singapore Anti-Narcotics Association
- Singapore Anti-Tuberculosis Association
- Singapore Association for Counselling
- Singapore Association for Mental Health
- Singapore Association for the Deaf
- Singapore Association for the Study of Obesity
- Singapore Association of Occupational Therapists
- Singapore Association of Social Workers
- Singapore Association of the Institute of Chartered Secretaries & Administrators
- Singapore Association of the Visually Handicapped
- Singapore Baptist Convention Golden Age Home
- Singapore Branch of the Missions to Seafarers
- Singapore Buddhist Federation
- Singapore Buddhist Free Clinic
- Singapore Buddhist Lodge
- Singapore Buddhist Lodge Vision Family Services
- Singapore Buddhist Lodge Welfare Foundation
- Singapore Buddhist Welfare Services
- Singapore Cancer Society
- Singapore Cheshire Home
- Singapore Children's Society
- Singapore Christian Home for the Aged
- Singapore Chung Hwa Medical Institution
- Singapore Committee of the World Organisation for Early Children Education
- Singapore Corporation of Rehabilitative Enterprises
- Singapore Council of Women's Organisations
- Singapore Dental Health Foundation
- Singapore Disability Sports Council
- Singapore General Hospital, Medical Social Service
- Singapore Gujarati Society
- Singapore Heart Foundation
- Singapore Hospice Council
- Singapore Heritage Society
- Singapore Indian Development Association
- Singapore Indian Education Trust
- Singapore International Chamber of Commerce
- Singapore International Foundation
- Singapore Kadayanallur Muslim League
- Singapore Leprosy Relief Association
- Singapore Life Saving Society
- Singapore Malay Youth Library Association (Taman Bacaan)
- Singapore National Stroke Association
- Singapore Nurses' Association
- Singapore Physiotherapy Association
- Singapore Planned Parenthood Association
- Singapore Polytechnic Welfare Services
- Singapore Professional Centre
- Singapore Psychological Society
- Singapore Red Cross Society
- Singapore Regional Centre of the World Fellowship of Buddhists
- Singapore Scout Association
- Singapore Society for the Prevention of Cruelty to Animals
- Singapore Tenkasi Muslim Welfare Society
- Singapore Thong Chai Medical Institution
- Singapore Women's Association
- Singhealth Polyclinics
- Society Against Family Violence
- Society for Continence
- Society for the Aged Sick
- Society for the Physically Disabled
- Society for the Prevention of Cruelty to Animals
- Society for the Promotion of ADHD Research and Knowledge
- Society of Moral Charities
- Society of Sheng Hong Welfare Services
- Society of Saint Vincent de Paul
- Soroptimist International of Singapore
- South Central Community Family Service Centre, formerly Bukit Ho Swee Family Service Centre
- Special Needs Trust Company
- Special Olympics Singapore
- Speech-Language and Hearing Association
- Sree Narayana Mission
- Sri Krishna Mandir Welfare Society
- St Andrew's Cathedral Home for the Aged
- St Andrew's Mission Hospital
- St Gabriel's Foundation
- St Hilda's Community Services Centre
- St John's Ambulance Brigade
- St John's Home for Elderly Persons
- St Luke's Elder Care
- St Luke's Hospital
- St. Hilda's Community Services Centre
- Student Advisory Centre
- Student Volunteer Corps
- Students Care Service (SCS)
- SUN-DAC
- Sunlove Abode for Intellectually-Infirmed
- Sunshine Welfare Action Mission

== T-Z ==
- Tai Pei Old People's Home
- Tampines Family Service Centre
- Tanjong Pagar Family Service Centre
- TBSC Spiritual Support Group
- Teen Challenge
- Temasek Polytechnic Community Service Club
- The Tent (organisation)
- The Red Pencil (Singapore)
- Thong Kheng Seniors Activity Centre (Henderson-Dawson)
- Thong Kheng Seniors Activity Centre (Queenstown)
- Thong Kheng Welfare Services Society
- Thong Teck Home for Senior Citizens
- Thye Hua Kwan Moral Society
- Toa Payoh East Student Care
- Toa Payoh Senior Citizens' Health Care Centre
- TOUCH Community Services
- Touch Home Care
- Touch Seniors Activity Centre
- TRANS Centre
- Tsao Foundation
- Turning Point
- Trybe
- Tzu Chi Singapore
- United Indian Muslim Association
- Vegetarian Society (Singapore), 16.6.1999
- Very Special Arts Singapore
- Viriya Community Services
- Volunteer Guitar Connection
- We-sharecare Society for Children & Youth
- Wesley Counselling Services
- Whampoa Eldercare Centre
- Whispering Hearts Family Service Centre
- Wicare Support Group
- Women's & Children's Healthcare Foundation
- Women's Initiative For Ageing Successfully
- Woodlands Social Centre
- World Red Swastika Society
- World Vision
- World Vision Singapore
- Xin Yuan Community Care
- XiSer Careserve
- Yayasan Mendaki
- Yong-En Care Centre
- YMCA of Singapore
- Young Women Muslim Association of Singapore
- Young Women's Christian Association of Singapore
- Youth Challenge
- Youth Guidance Outreach Services
- YWCA Adult Care Centre
- YWCA Child Development Centre (Bishan)
- Zhi Zhen Tan Dao Xue Hui (Singapore)
- Zion Home for the Aged
- Zonta Club of Singapore

== See also ==
- List of disability organisations in Singapore
- List of youth organisations in Singapore
