= List of disability organisations in Singapore =

This is a list of disability organizations in Singapore.

== General ==
- City Harvest Community Services Association
- Disabled People's Association
- Touch Community Services
- Rainbow Centre
- Presbyterian Community Services
- Christian Outreach for The Handicapped
- Extra•Ordinary People

== Autism ==
- Autistic Association
- Autism Resource Centre
- Christian Outreach for The Handicapped
- Pathlight School
- St. Andrew's Mission School

== Cerebral Palsy ==
- Cerebral Palsy Alliance Singapore

== Cleft Lip & Palate ==
- Cleft Lip and Palate Association of Singapore

== Down syndrome ==
- Down Syndrome Association

== Dyslexia ==
- Cornerstone Learning Needs Centre
- Dyslexia Association of Singapore
- Student Care Service
- Swords & Stationery

== Muscular Dystrophy ==
- Muscular Dystrophy Association
- Motor Neurone Disease Association

== Deaf ==
- Singapore Association for the Deaf
- Singapore School for the Deaf
- Canossian School
- ExtraOrdinary Horizons (Deaf Singapore)

== Intellectual disabilities ==
- Movement for the Intellectually Disabled of Singapore
- Association for Persons with Special Needs
- Metta School
- Grace Orchard School
- SUN-DAC

== Physical disabilities ==
- Social Services
- SPD
- National Disability League

== Rare Disorders ==
- Rare Disorders Society of Singapore

== Visual impairment ==
- Singapore Association of the Visually Handicapped
- Guide Dogs Singapore

== Others ==
- Children's Cancer Foundation
- Singapore Children Society
- Singapore Disability Sports Council
- Special Olympics Singapore
- Very Special Arts Singapore

== See also ==
- List of youth organisations in Singapore
- List of social service agencies in Singapore
