= Singapore Sign Language =

Sign Language used in Singapore

- Native to: Singapore
- Signers: 6,000 (2021); Number includes both pidgin signed English and "natural sign language"
- Language family: French Sign: American Sign; Singapore Sign Language

Language codes
- ISO 639-3: sls
- Glottolog: sing1237

Singapore Sign Language, or SgSL, is the native sign language used by the deaf and hard of hearing in Singapore, developed over six decades since the establishment of the first school for the Deaf in 1954. Since Singapore's independence in 1965, the Singapore deaf community has had to adapt to many linguistic changes. Today, the local deaf community recognises Singapore Sign Language (SgSL) as a reflection of Singapore's diverse culture. SgSL is influenced by Shanghainese Sign Language (SSL), American Sign Language (ASL), Signing Exact English (SEE-II) and locally developed signs.

The total number of deaf clients registered with The Singapore Association For The Deaf (SADeaf), an organisation that advocates equal opportunity for the deaf, is 5,756, as of 2014. Among which, only about one-third stated their knowledge of Sign Language.

== History of sign language in Singapore ==
=== 1950s - Beginnings ===
The history of sign language in Singapore can be traced back to 1951 when pioneer deaf educator Peng Tsu Ying left China for Singapore to teach deaf children in their homes. Born in Shanghai, Peng became deaf at the age of 6, and was educated in Hong Kong School for the Deaf (now known as Chun Tok School) and Shanghai Chung Wah School for the Deaf. With Peng's education background in Shanghainese Sign Language (SSL) and together with a group of Chinese merchants, the Singapore Chinese Sign School for the deaf was opened in March 1954. At that time, Singapore was predominantly Chinese and many diverse varieties were spoken. Peng and his wife, also deaf, used SSL in the sign school to teach children to read in Chinese and other subjects at the primary level.

During the same period in the early 1950s, the Singapore Red Cross began conducting oral classes for deaf children and provided counselling services for parents of deaf children. As the demand for classes increased, the Singapore Red Cross Society and officials of the Social Welfare Department founded The Singapore Association For The Deaf (SADeaf) (then known as Singapore Deaf and Dumb Association) in 1955. It was in 1963 when the sign school and the oral school merged to become the Singapore School for the Deaf (SSD). Within the same premises, students in the oral section of the school were taught in English as the medium of instruction, while students in the signing section of the school were taught in Chinese, with SSL as the medium of instruction.

=== 1966 – Bilingual policy ===
The bilingual education policy, which came into effect in 1966, marked a linguistic transition for Singapore. The policy places English as the main medium of instruction. Since English became the language of instruction in the education sector, parents could choose education through any one of the four official languages (Mandarin, Malay, Tamil) but all students also had to study English, in non-English-medium schools. The government then required all schools to teach Math and Science in English starting at primary one.

This policy is significant to the local deaf community because it has marked a change in educating the deaf. Singapore, once under colonial rule, had been influenced by the British in learning English through the oral method. Furthermore, mainstream education in Singapore was moving towards English education and schools were beginning to switch to English as a medium of instruction. This posed a dilemma to the deaf community because the oral method was not suited to every student. While parents wanted their children to learn English, they have been learning SSL, which was associated with written Chinese.

=== 1970s ===
Lim Chin Heng, a former student under Peng, went to the United States of America (USA) to learn English and American Sign Language (ASL). While studying, Lim also got to know some of the professors and authors in USA who were developing a sign system to teach English specifically, called Signing Exact English (SEE-II). Lim became the first Singaporean to enter Gallaudet University in Washington, D.C., an American university for the deaf. He graduated in with a degree in Mathematics, returned to Singapore and introduced ASL to the deaf community by 1974. Written English was known to be associated with ASL because ASL has seen the fewest generational breaks and was well-transmitted as compared to European counterparts. The international deaf community looked up to America as having a strong tradition in protecting their deaf and deaf rights. Hence, ASL was adopted to teach English as a medium of instruction to the deaf because it was seen as the best sign language to learn English.

In 1976, SADeaf invited Frances M. Parsons, then an associate professor at the Gallaudet University to promote Total Communication. Total Communication is a philosophy which uses signs, speech, gestures, speech reading, amplification, finger spelling, and/ or other mode of communication to provide linguistic input to deaf children. In the same year, Lim also brought back SEE-II to the local deaf community.

By 1977, the Total Communication approach was fully implemented in SSD. Lim also taught basic ASL classes for teachers and eventually ASL was taught to students in SSD. By 1978, SEE-II was adopted as the mode of communication and instruction by SADeaf in its affiliated schools, in SSD and Vocational School for the Handicapped (now known as Mountbatten Vocational School). However, the sign section of SSD, which used SSL, was phased out in 1983 because there were gradually fewer parents who opted for a Chinese education for their deaf children.

In 1985, SADeaf joined the World Federation of the Deaf.

=== 2000s ===
The term Singapore Sign Language (SgSL) was coined by Andrew Tay in 2008. Tay emphasised the importance of SgSL in the deaf community to help deaf people develop their self-esteem, self-confidence, cognitive power as well as recognise their deaf identity.

In September 2017, the Singapore School for the Deaf shut down because enrollment had fallen from about 300 in the 1980s to 20 in the 2010s. Remaining students were transferred to Lighthouse School, a special education school for children who are visually or hearing impaired.

From 2018, deaf students who use sign language to communicate attend Lighthouse School at the primary level before getting mainstreamed at the secondary level at Beatty Secondary School. Deaf students educated under the oral approach attend the Cannossian School at the primary level before getting mainstreamed at the secondary level at Outram Secondary School and St Anthony’s Canossian Secondary School.

== Language and sign systems used in Singapore ==
While Singapore does not have a national sign language, the local deaf community recognises Singapore Sign Language (SgSL) as Singapore's native sign language. This is because sign language in Singapore has developed over the last 6 decades since the setting up of the first school for local deaf in 1954. Hence, there is crucial need to preserve and maintain local signs invented by the deaf community in Singapore since the early 1950s. Various sign languages have been adopted and used by the local deaf community as a result of linguistic changes. SgSL is influenced by Shanghainese Sign Language (SSL), American Sign Language (ASL), Signing Exact English (SEE-II) and locally developed signs. It also comprises different types of systems, including SEE-II, Pidgin Signed English (PSE) and gestures. Today, SgSL consists of the following language and sign systems:

=== Language systems ===
==== Pidgin Signed English (PSE) ====
Pidgin Signed English (PSE) is a variety or style of language that arises from contact between natural sign language (in this case being SgSL) and the surrounding spoken language, or between different sign languages. It involves the use of SgSL following the spoken English Language word order with simplified or reduced grammar. The use of PSE also occurs when there is contact between two sign languages. In this instance, foreign sign borrowing, code-switching, fingerspelling, mouthing, and mixed systems are used.

=== Sign system ===
==== Signed Exact English (SEE-II) ====
SEE-II is a Manually Coded English system. It is a sign system that English Language visual through the hands. It was developed in 1969 in Southern California, United States with the aim of teaching deaf children English. About 75% to 80% of SEE-II signs are either borrowed from ASL or modified ASL signs. Unlike ASL, SEE-II is not a language but merely a mode of communication.

== Current approaches to deaf education ==
=== Oral approach ===
Children with hearing impairments receive education through the oral approach method at Canossian School (or CS; it was formerly known as Canossian School for the Hearing Impaired). The Directory of Services for the Disabled states that students at CS are taught using the Natural Auditory-Oral Philosophy, which emphasises the use of audition. Teaching is done without any form of signs or sign language. Hearing-impaired pupils in general public schools access the school curriculum through speech, in the same environment like their hearing classmates.

The technological progress and development of hearing aids and cochlear implants allow hearing-impaired children to participate in class. Additional therapy programmes provided by schools and other specialised institutions, as in the case of CSHI with their Audio Verbal Therapy (AVT) or the Listen and Talk programme at the Singapore General Hospital, aim to improve performance of hearing-impaired children in a beneficial setting. The Listen and Talk Programme uses the Auditory-Verbal approach, which helps children access speech and language primarily through auditory input. It allows to integrate affected children in mainstream schools so that their hearing classmates function as important language models in their learning process.

=== Sign approach ===
American Sign Language (ASL) was introduced to Singapore's deaf community by Lim Chin Heng, in 1974. Lim Chin Heng was instructed by Peng Tsu Ying and additionally studied English and ASL at Gallaudet University in the United States. During that period, mainstream education in Singapore shifted from a diverse to a uniform language teaching system. English was promoted as the language of instruction in Singaporean schools, and ASL served as a medium of instruction. ASL is still used in Singapore today.

Signing Exact English (SEE-II) is not a language itself but a sign coded version of English, meaning it utilises the vocabulary of ASL with the English grammar.

== Challenges ==
Sign language is often viewed as subordinate to spoken language. For both adults and children within the deaf community, this perception, to some extent, leads to them becoming unable to learn sign language, which negatively impacts them socially. The Deaf and Hard of Hearing Federation of Singapore acknowledges that sign language is not the popular choice to educate the deaf population, but it is of good benefit for parents to expose their deaf children to both sign and oral language.

=== Local Observations ===
It is difficult to determine if a bilingual (native sign language and English) education program for the deaf in Singapore would be beneficial, since little is known about their language. There is a lack of government documentation that recognises a native sign language in Singapore, thus there is also not much regulation in place to monitor how useful sign language is for Singaporeans and its deaf population; it is a continuing process in improving its application.

In Singapore, no one has been able to identify a language that is native of the deaf population, although the public would say that the deaf use "sign language" to communicate. This "sign language", Signing Exact English (SEE-II), is not a sign language, but a Manually Coded English sign system. While the SEE-II system is continually being used to help deaf people improve their grasp of English, Singapore Sign Language (SgSL) is evolving as another method for them to communicate. And both of these systems pose challenges to establishing sign language as a standard in Singapore.

=== Challenges facing Signing Exact English (SEE-II) ===
The use of SEE-II to educate Singaporean deaf children and even adults, is an ongoing issue. This is because most of the deaf population in Singapore are not raised in English-speaking homes. Thus, parents have a difficulty learning sign language because these classes are conducted only in English and SEE-II. The idea behind these systems is that Deaf children will learn English better if they are exposed, visually through signs, to the grammatical features of English. However, exposure to them does not always provide children with the complete linguistic access, which is needed to internalise the whole language. So, there needs to be a better way for parents with hearing-impaired children to effectively communicate with them. On the other hand, if this concern with SEE-II is left unaddressed, more parents may choose to not educate their sons and/or daughters using SEE-II or sign language.

=== Challenges facing Singapore Sign Language (SgSL) ===
There is a need to standardise the use of Singapore Sign Language (SgSL) based on cultural elements. Language instruction of Signing Exact English for the Deaf does not get used when they are amongst themselves in the deaf community. Despite SEE-II being adopted as the language of instruction among deaf children in Singapore since 1977, and its use as a system of communication in the Deaf community in Singapore, it is of utmost importance to preserve and maintain local signs invented by the Deaf community in Singapore since the early 1950s. With Singapore Sign Language (SgSL), depending on the background of the Deaf, local signs of SgSL often are invented and used by them, and they are not necessarily formally and officially indexed. This is a concern such that essentially, the SgSL language lends itself to many ambiguities when it comes to its expression. Additionally, Singapore Sign Language (SgSL) has not gone through any form of linguistic research/study; this is because of a lack in government resources and funding. This basically means that it is hard to rely on the deaf population to provide updates on the local vocabularies and sign systems of SgSL, and poses an even greater obstacle for the Sign Language Interpreting community in gaining a better handle on and about the language itself.

Currently, the Linguistic Sub-Committee at the Singapore Association does research into SgSL for the Deaf (SADeaf). They aim to set up a sign bank to record locally developed signs and also to better understand SgSL so as to create resources for the general public as well as members of the Deaf community. They are trying to progress in the research of SgSL in order to lead to corpus development. And out of corpus development, the aim is to produce material that is more accurate in the teaching of the sign language. This, however, is still in the beginning stages; this is the case because the matter is highly complex in Singapore.

== Moving forward ==
The Singapore Sign Language (SgSL) Week 2014, in conjunction with the International Week for the Deaf, is a platform for the local deaf community to promote the awareness of SgSL and Deaf culture.

The Singapore Sign Language (SgSL) linguistics sub-committee has been formed to perform research on SgSL that will eventually lead to corpus development, which will be used to produce material that is more accurate in the teaching of SgSL. The committee is currently in its second term. Plans have also been made to start a preschool that focuses on language acquisition.

In addition, SADeaf organises carnivals and exhibition with its partners to reach out and promote public understanding of deafness and awareness of deaf people in the society. SADeaf has recently organised SgSL Week 2014, from 22 to 28 September 2014, in conjunction with International Week for the Deaf. The theme for International Week for the Deaf is “Strengthening Human Diversity”. The SgSL Week is a platform for the local deaf community to stand proud as Deaf, and to promote the awareness of SgSL and Deaf culture.

Based on the situation in Singapore, there are further recommendations that may be made in order for Singapore Sign Language (SgSL) to progress further, and establish itself in a more prominent sense. More hearing people in Singapore will need to be educated in SgSL, learn it and the manual alphabet to provide more communication and social interaction between deaf and the hearing populations alike. What has been recognised is the need to give every deaf child as early as possible in his/her life as much language education as possible through whatever communication input best suits the child's learning aptitude.

== See also ==
- American Sign Language
- Chinese Sign Language
- Deaf culture
- Finger spelling
- Hearing-impaired
- Manually Coded Language
- Pidgin Signed English
- Sign Language
- Signing Exact English
- Total Communication
