= List of schools in Singapore =

Singapore's public schools come under the purview of the Ministry of Education. Singapore has many primary schools and secondary schools, as well as junior colleges, centralised institutes, polytechnics and universities providing tertiary education.

Under the Compulsory Education Act which came into effect on 1 January 2003, all children have to start attending primary school at the age of 7. It is a criminal offence to fail to do so; however, parents may apply for an exemption from the Ministry of Education for their child to be homeschooled or to attend full-time religious institutions.

== Junior Colleges and Millennia Institute ==
Below is a list of schools offering a two or three-year pre-university education in Singapore, along with the special programmes offered by the schools. The year of establishment in this article reflects the year in which the pre-university programme is implemented, particularly for the Integrated Programme High Schools. All pre-university programmes in Singapore are mixed-sex in tandem with the Ministry of Education's (MOE) requirements. These schools can be divided into two groups: junior colleges and centralised institutes.

=== Junior colleges (JC) ===
These offer two-year courses leading to the Singapore-Cambridge GCE 'A' Level or International Baccalaureate examinations.

Code	Planning Area	Planning Subzone	College name			Established	Address	Type	Special programmes	Remarks	Mascot
Code	Planning Area	Planning Subzone	English	Chinese	Abb.	Established	Address	Type	Special programmes	Remarks	Mascot
0715	Ang Mo Kio	Yio Chu Kang	Anderson Serangoon Junior College	安德逊实龙岗初级学院	ASRJC	1984 (AJC) 1988 (SRJC) 2019 (ASRJC)	4500 Ang Mo Kio Avenue 6	Government	TLEP	Formed from the merger of Anderson JC and Serangoon JC	Unknown
0803	Queenstown	Dover	Anglo-Chinese Junior College	英华初级学院	ACJC	1977	25 Dover Close East	Government-aided	ELEP, HSP, MEP, DEP		Unknown
7001	Queenstown	Dover	Anglo-Chinese IB Junior College	英华自主中学	ACS(I)	1886	121 Dover Road	Independent	MEP, HSP, RSP	International Baccalaureate Diploma Programme	Unknown
0802	Novena	Malcolm	Catholic Junior College	公教初级学院	CJC	1975	129 Whitley Road	Government-aided	ELEP		Anthropomorphic flame
3101	Kallang	Tanjong Rhu	Dunman High School	德明政府中学	DHS	1956 2005 – IP	10 Tanjong Rhu Road	Autonomous	BSP, CLEP, MEP	Accepting first batch of JAE students from 2019	Duncan the Eagle
0714	Queenstown	Ghim Moh	Eunoia Junior College	诺雅初级学院	EJC	2017	2 Sin Ming Place	Government	MSP, HSP, BSP		Eunoia Otter
0806	Bukit Timah	Coronation Road	Hwa Chong Institution	华侨中学	HCI	1974(HCJC) 2005(HCI)	661 Bukit Timah Road	Independent	AEP, CLEP, HSP, BSP		JTigerr the Tiger
0718	Choa Chu Kang	Teck Whye	Jurong Pioneer Junior College	裕廊先驱初级学院	JPJC	1981 (JJC) 1999 (PJC) 2019 (JPJC)	21 Teck Whye Walk	Government	CLEP, MLEP	Formed from the merger of Jurong JC and Pioneer JC	Unknown
0805	Serangoon	Serangoon Central	Nanyang Junior College	南洋初级学院	NYJC	1978	128 Serangoon Avenue 3	Government-aided	AEP, CLEP		Nyla the Lion
0701	Bukit Timah	Hillcrest	National Junior College	国家初级学院	NJC	1969	37 Hillcrest Road	Government	AEP, CLEP, HSP		Lion
3009	Bishan	Marymount	Raffles Institution	莱佛士书院	RI	1982(RJC) 2009 (RI)	1 Raffles Institution Lane	Independent	ELEP, HSP, MEP, RSP		Griffles the Griffin
3103	Jurong West	Boon Lay Place	River Valley High School	立化中学	RVHS	1956	6 Boon Lay Avenue	Autonomous	BSP	Accepting first batch of JAE students from 2019	Unknown
0804	Toa Payoh	Potong Pasir	Saint Andrew's Junior College	圣安德烈初级学院	SAJC	1978	5 Sorby Adams Drive	Government-aided			Andrew the Tiger
7020	Novena	Malcolm	St. Joseph's Institution	圣若瑟书院	SJI	1852	38 Malcolm Road	Independent		International Baccalaureate Diploma Programme	Unknown
0717	Pasir Ris	Pasir Ris West	Tampines Meridian Junior College	淡滨尼美廉初级学院	TMJC	1986 (TPJC) 2003 (MJC) 2019 (TMJC)	21 Pasir Ris Street 71	Government	DEP, MLEP	Formed from the merger of Tampines JC and Meridian JC	Blue lion
0702	Bedok	Bedok South	Temasek Junior College	淡马锡初级学院	TJC	1977	22 Bedok South Road	Government	CLEP, HSP. MEP		Shroomie the Mushroom
0706	Bedok	Siglap	Victoria Junior College	维多利亚初级学院	VJC	1984	20 Marine Vista	Government	HSP, DEP, RSP		Bear mascot Bobby (Humanoid)
0716	Yishun	Yishun West	Yishun Innova Junior College	义顺星烁初级学院	YIJC	1986 (YJC) 2005 (IJC) 2019 (YIJC)	3 Yishun Ring Road	Government	MLEP	Formed from the merger of Yishun JC and Innova JC	SPARKYI the Torch

=== Millennia Institute (MI) ===
The only centralized institute in Singapore is Millennia Institute (MI), which offers a three-year course leading to the GCE A-level examination in arts, science, and commerce.

=== Abbreviations ===
MOE-based programmes:

- AEP = Art Elective Programme
- MEP = Music Elective Programme
- RSP = Regional Studies Programme
- HSP = Humanities Scholarship and Programme
- CLEP = Language Elective Programme (Chinese)
- MLEP = Language Elective Programme (Malay)
- TLEP = Language Elective Programme (Tamil)
- ELEP = Language Elective Programme (English)
- BSP = Bicultural Studies Programme

== Polytechnics ==
Founded	Polytechnic		Students
Founded	Full name	Abbrev.	Students
1954	Singapore Polytechnic 新加坡理工学院; Politeknik Singapura சிங்கப்பூர் பலதுறைத் தொழில்நுட்பக்கல்லூரி	SP	16,871 (2022)
1963	Ngee Ann Polytechnic 义安理工学院; Politeknik Ngee Ann நீ யான் பலதுறைத் தொழில்நுட்பக் கல்லூரி)	NP	13,637 (2021)
1990	Temasek Polytechnic 淡马锡理工学院; Politeknik Temasek தெமாசெக் பலதுறைத் தொழில்நுட்பக் கல்லூரி	TP	14,248 (2019)
1992	Nanyang Polytechnic 南洋理工学院; Politeknik Nanyang நன்யாங் பலதுறைத் தொழில்நுட்பக் கல்லூரி	NYP	14,715 (2019)
2002	Republic Polytechnic 共和理工学院; Politeknik Republik ரிப்பப்லிக் பலதுறைத் தொழில்நுட்பக் கல்லூரி	RP	11,668 (2022)

== Institute of Technical Education (ITE) ==
The Institute of Technical Education campuses were reorganized under the "collegiate system" into three major colleges around the island, a regrouping and renaming exercise which took effect on 1 January 2005. ITE College East was the first to open in Simei in January 2005, and the existing "ITE East Network" campuses were renamed as "ITE College Central" campuses, to be replaced by a new campus in Ang Mo Kio. "ITE West Network" campuses were renamed "ITE College West" campuses, and their new campus will be at Choa Chu Kang.

- ITE College Central (Regional Campus at Ang Mo Kio)
- ITE College West (Regional Campus at Choa Chu Kang)
- ITE College East (Regional Campus at Simei)

== University of the Arts Singapore ==
In March 2021, Minister for Education Lawrence Wong announced that Singapore’s first arts university will be established in an alliance between the Nanyang Academy of Fine Arts and LASALLE College of the Arts, in a system akin to the University of the Arts, London. The formation of the University of the Arts Singapore (UAS) will see both colleges under the umbrella university be given degree-awarding powers independent of their current foreign partners, where the current long-distance degrees are issued through foreign universities. Singaporeans and permanent residents (PRs) enrolled in the approved degree programmes at the university of the arts will pay subsidised fees, comparable to those at autonomous universities here.

The seventh local university of Singapore will be the only publicly-funded private university other than the now defunct and restructured UniSIM in Singapore, and also the only university of the arts with its own degree-conferring power in Singapore slated to open in 2024.

Constituent colleges:

- Nanyang Academy of Fine Arts
- LASALLE College of the Arts

== Specialised tertiary schools ==
Government-Affiliated

- BCA Academy
- Singapore Aviation Academy
- IP Academy

Others

- Jewellery Design and Management International School
- Orita Sinclair School of Design and Music
- MAD School
- Intercultural Theatre Institute

== Language Centres ==
- Cambridge Institute (Singapore)
- Ministry of Education Language Centre
- Umar Pulavar Tamil Language Centre

== Special education schools ==
- Rainbow Centre (operates Margaret Drive Special School)
- Pathlight School

== Supplementary schools ==
The Japanese Supplementary School Singapore (JSS; シンガポール日本語補習授業校 Shingapōru Nihongo Hoshū Jugyō Kō) - a Japanese supplementary school

== Medical schools ==
- NTU LKC - Lee Kong Chian School of Medicine
- NUS YLL - Yong Loo Lin School of Medicine
- Duke–NUS Medical School
