= List of youth organisations in Singapore =

This lists youth organisations in Singapore:

== Community ==
- NYAA Gold Award Holders' Alumni
- nEbO
- Junior Chamber of Singapore
- National Youth Council of Singapore, The
- *SCAPE Co. Ltd,
- Tzu Chi Humanistic Youth Centre,
- People's Association Youth Movement
- People's Association T-Net Club, The
- Generation ACTS Club, The
- Legion of Mary, The
- Metropolitan YMCA,

== Nature ==
- Students Against Violation of the Earth (SAVE)
- Youth Environmental Network

== Health and Wellness ==
- Youth Advolution for Health (YAH)
- SHY - Sexual Health and Wellness for Youths
- Shadee.Care

== Outdoors ==
- People's Association Adventure Pursuits
- Raleigh Society
- Singapore Adventurers' Club
- Singapore Youth Flying Club
- Sunny Island Tree Climbers

== Uniformed groups ==
- National Cadet Corps
- National Civil Defence Cadet Corps
- National Police Cadet Corps
- Red Cross Youth, Singapore Red Cross
- Saint John Ambulance Brigade, Singapore
- Girl Guides Singapore
- The Boys' Brigade in Singapore
- Girls' Brigade Singapore
- The Singapore Scout Association

== Volunteer organisations ==
- AIESEC Singapore
- Heartware Network
- SGRainbow
- Young Out Here

== Musical Groups ==
- Singapore National Youth Orchestra
- Singapore Youth Wind Symphony
- Singapore Symphony Youth Choir [32]
- Singapore Symphony Children's Choir [33]

== See also ==
- List of social service agencies in Singapore
- List of disability organisations in Singapore
