= Abigail Chay =

Singaporean comedian (born 1959)

- 谢季
- Born: 19 May 1959 (age 67)
- Education: Anglo-Chinese School
- Occupations: Actor, comedian, entertainer
- Years active: 1995–present

Chinese name
- Simplified Chinese: 谢季
Transcriptions
Standard Mandarin
- Hanyu Pinyin: Xiè Jì

Abigail Chay (Note: Chinese: 谢季; pinyin: Xiè Jì) (born 19 May 1959) is a transgender actor, comedian and entertainer in Singapore.

She is known for her role as Auntie Abigail in Under One Roof in 1995, and came out to the public in a Mediacorp programme based on her life titled Life Story in 2006. Her life story was used as the basis of the musical I Am What I Am (2012) in Hong Kong.

== Early life ==
Abigail Chay was born on 19 May 1959. She is an only child. Her name, which symbolises "chastity", was given by her father.

At a young age, she played with dolls, and was happy when she was made to wear a dress by her housekeeper, receiving compliments from neighbours. Chay first noticed that she was different from the public when she realised that she felt attracted to boys instead of girls. She then read psychology books and concluded that she required gender transition, but kept it to herself. She also held an interest for performing, especially in Chinese opera.

Chay is English-educated, and studied at the all-boys Anglo-Chinese School. She found that school was not hostile and could instead distract her from her identity crisis. Chay entered National Service, which she was initially scared of, but was treated well in. After, she worked as a window display artist at Heshe, a fashion shop.

Her mother, who was famous for being a grandmother in McDonald's advertisements from 1992, died in 2002 of heart failure. Her father died in 2019.

== Career ==
Chay is well-known in Singapore for being a transgender comedian and entertainer, which she worked part-time. Chay said that acting is therapeutic as it allowed one to laugh at themselves with an audience. She hosted corporate Dungeons & Dragons parties and also taught acting at community clubs. Chay also volunteered in interest groups such as the Talent Artiste Pool, in which she shared knowledge about the entertainment industry, and Scriptless Drama, targeted at seniors doing improv, to prevent dementia. She also ran an entertainment company, with a course titled "Shine On", targeted to children to try various show business activities such as acting and singing.

After acting in Under One Roof as the single Auntie Abigail in 1995, she became famous, but people involved in production from the Television Corporation of Singapore did not wish to promote her, and instructed her mother to not talk about Chay's acting career. Tan Dawn Wei of The Straits Times described the character as "desperate" and "ugly", which were her defining traits; she received disgust from Tan Ah Teck, another character, when he saw her. In 1995, after appearing in Under One Roof, Chay was outed as a "female impersonator" by Christine Ty of Charactors, a production house and talent agency, to which she was disappointed at.

In 1998, Chay debuted with a play titled The Christmas Bride, a musical comedy which she wrote, after attending a playwriting class at the Nanyang Academy of Fine Arts. She acted as a bride whose wedding day was ruined by the groom's ex-lover.

In 1998, she performed in a comedy play titled Vanity Unfair with Norleena Salim, which was a commentary on inner and outer beauty. In 2003, she acted in The Trouble With Living with Salim and Ezan Ismail as a Bond girl. In 2004, she performed in Esplanade with other comedians, where she parodied Hsu Chun Mei, a Taiwanese television celebrity.

Chay also played other roles, such as Ah Bao's feminine side in the stage drama Crystal Boys (1997), as a lonely ghost in Maggi and Mee (2005), in Singapore Broadcasting Corporation's Growing Up series, in Channel 8 dramas The Legendary Swordsman and Time After Time, and in movies like We Are Family by Alan Tam and Money No Enough by Jack Neo. Chay has also acted with her mother in at least eight stage shows, until her mother's death in 2002.

Her personal life was first used as the basis of a Mediacorp programme in 2006 titled Life Story, which she came out in as transgender, after a wish by her mother to do so; her identity had only been speculated by people before. The story portrayed her parents as "heroes". She hoped that the programme will help people understand her situation better and help others with a similar identity crisis. Murali Sharma wrote to Today that the story was an inspiration for unconventional people with a low self-esteem. George Seetoh of The Straits Times wrote that more understanding should come from the society so parents could accept their children better.

== Personal life ==
Chay is Christian. According to Li Xueying of The Straits Times, she is known for being thin. She describes herself as being excessively trusting, having lost sums of money in investments after being taken advantage of.

She underwent gender-affirming surgery at 22 at Thomson Medical Centre, which was paid by her parents, after all four psychologists she visited recommended an operation. Her parents initially felt that her gender transition was unjust, but gradually accepted her identity after. Chay stopped teaching tuition to the class that she presented male in, passing off her responsibilities to her cousin. In order to present more feminine, she took personal grooming and modelling classes in 2012.

By 2006, Chay had six relationships with men, most of whom could not accept that she was transgender. After the surgery, she enter a one-year marriage, which ended in a divorce due to the husband's insecurity. Her father was unsupportive of the marriage.

Her personal life was the inspiration of the Cantonese and Mandarin musical titled I Am What I Am (2012) in Hong Kong. Angus Chan, a Hong Kong actor, played the role of Chay.

In July 2006, she shaved her head as part of the Children's Cancer Foundation charity, for their annual Hair For Hope event, and wore a wig after in daily life. In 2024, Chay underwent surgery for hernia, after having had digestive problems and being unable to eat fibrous food. On 10 July 2026, she held a living funeral so she could hear people commemorate her while she was alive, and hopes that it motivates more people to be open to the topic of death.
