= Lionel Cresson =

Singaporean industrialist and chemist (1900–1990)

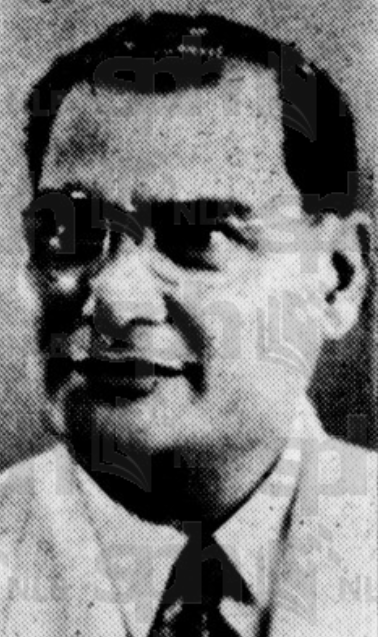
Cresson in 1953

Lionel Cresson (18 April 1900 – 24 August 1990) was a Singaporean industralist, chemist and inventor who served as the founding chairman of the Board of Governors of the Singapore Polytechnic and as a founding member and president of both the Singapore Manufacturers' Association and the Singapore Federation of Industrialists and Traders. He also served as the president of the Rotary Club of Singapore from 1948 to 1950.

== Early life and education ==
Cresson was born in Singapore on 18 April 1900 and received his education at the Raffles Institution. He was of English and French descent. He then qualified as a chemical engineer and rubber technologist in London.

== Career ==
Cresson was first employed at the Singapore Rubber Works of the Netherlands Gutta Percha Company as an assistant chemist in around 1919. The Singapore Free Press and Mercantile Advertiser reported in April 1921 that Cresson had already been granted membership of the Society of Chemical Industry in the United Kingdom, that he had just become a member of the American Chemical Society and that he would be made a member of the latter society's rubber division. In October, Cresson, who was then a chemist at the works, made an invention which aided in rubber paving. Later that month, he was granted a patent for his invention, which he named 'Terra-caoutchouc blocks'. For his invention, he was made an associate of the Institution of the Rubber Industry, who also awarded him with their degrees in science and rubber technology. By August 1921, Cresson had become a member of the Rotary Club of Singapore. He was involved in a trade exhibition organised by the organisation held in January of the following year, sitting on the Exhibition Committee in charge of the event. The efficiency of his invention was first tested in 1929 on Lombard Street and Croydon Road in London and Tanjong Pagar Road in Singapore. In June 1932, he was granted privileges for "improved manufacture of terra-caoutchouc blocks or slabs or sheets for road, floor, wall or other rubber surfacing" under the Inventions Ordinance. In the same year, he became a founding member of the Singapore Manufacturers' Association. He later served as the association's president. The blocks, which came to be known as 'Cresson rubber blocks', were the "first successful rubber flooring" to be produced in Singapore. However, it was later found that using asphalt to build roads was more economical and by April 1975, it was believed that the only remaining blocks in use were the ones used to lay Lombard Street.

In April 1935, Cresson was elected a director of the Rotary Club for the year of 1935-1936. He had become the technical manager of the Singapore Rubber Works by June 1936. In June 1937, he was elected to the committee of the Straits Settlements (Singapore) Association. In 1940, Cresson attended a Group Council meeting held in Delhi, India, after which he began producing materials for the war effort. He also sat on the Munitions Committee. In early 1942, shortly before the Fall of Singapore to the Japanese, he was sent to Java to obtain materials for the war effort in the Middle East. However, he was found there by the Japanese who then placed him in solitary confinement for seven months. After this, he spent the rest of the Japanese Occupation in "normal internment". Following the end of the occupation in September 1945, Cresson returned to Singapore and "lost no time" in reorganising the Singapore Rubber Works. By November, he had become the company's managing director. On 25 December 1946, he bought over the Singapore Rubber Works, which he soon renamed Cressonite Industries Ltd. In January 1947, he announced that the company would begin producing plastics, textiles, and insulated cables, which were reportedly industries "new to Singapore". The company would soon consist of several sections, including a technical rubber goods division, a plastics division, an asbestos division, a latex processing division and a division from articles made of latex, with a latex division still under planning.

In May 1947, Cresson was appointed a member of the Municipal Commission of Singapore in place of David Keri Walters. By July, he had also become the vice-president of the Rotary Club. In that month, he was also elected the Singapore employers' delegate to the Preparatory Asiatic Zone Conference organised by the International Labour Organization, to be held in New Delhi in October. In December, he became the vice-president of the newly-formed People's Educational Association, which was to promote education and cultural welfare amongst locals. Cresson was also a founding member of the Singapore Anti-Tuberculosis Association, which was formed in that year. As the vice-president of the Rotary Club, he was the "prime-mover" in establishing the Rotary Tuberculosis Clinic at the Tan Tock Seng Hospital, which was first conceived in 1946 and opened in 1948. Cresson raised $250,000 for the clinic and the government provided another $250,000. The Singapore Manufacturers' Association appointed him in January 1948 as its representative on the Labour Advisory Board after an emergency meeting of the Singapore Federation of Trade Unions which called for the board to be expanded. The Municipal Commission appointed him its representative on a special committee created by the government to tackle parking issues in Singapore. In May, Cresson was elected the president of the Rotary Club.

Cresson was the president of the first council of the Federation of Industrialists and Traders in Singapore, which registered as a trade union in June. The following month, he was elected the president of the Singapore branch of the United Nations International Emergency Children's Fund. Cresson was elected a member of the committee of the Far East branch of the Overseas League in February 1949. In March, he was appointed a member of the Singapore Education Committee. Cresson resigned from his position on the Municipal Commission in April, when the commission was reconstituted. He was appointed a member of the Singapore Social Welfare Council of the Social Welfare Department in May. In July, Cresson was made a Justice of the Peace. He was appointed a delegate to a conference of the International Labour Organisation, held in September at the Victoria Memorial Hall in Singapore. On 1 July 1950, he was succeeded as president of the Rotary Club by Yap Pheng Geck, the director of the Sze Hai Tong Bank. In April 1951, Cresson was elected a member of the Singapore Ratepayers' Association. On 30 November 1951, he was appointed a member of the Public Service Commission following the resignation of Reynold Lionel Eber. He continued to serve on the commission until December 1956.

In April 1952, he became a member of the six-man delegation of Rotary Club members led by club president Konstantin Michael Engelmann who attended the Rotary District 46 Conference, held in Kuala Lumpur. By March 1953, he had made several inventions involving rubber and had served as the chairman of the Traffic Advisory Board. He acted as the chairman of the Singapore Association for the Blind in May. In that year, he sold off Cressonite Industries. Cresson was conferred the OBE in February of the following year for his "active interest in public affairs and his social welfare activity." In January 1955, he was made the founding president of the 17-man Board of Governors of the Singapore Polytechnic. The following month, he was appointed a Visitor to the Woodbridge Hospital. In April, he was appointed a member of the newly-established Singapore Hotels Licensing Board. In August 1956, he was elected president of the newly-formed Apex Club of Singapore. By January 1957, Cresson had become the chairman of the Singapore Deaf and Dumb Association. He had been appointed the chairman of the Singapore Industrial Promotions Board, which was formed by the government to handle applications for loans and technical advice, by July. In that month, he succeeded Alan E. M. Geddes as the director of the Singapore branch of the British Red Cross Society. He retired from business in that year to focus on both the Singapore Polytechnic Board of Governors and the Singapore Industrial Promotions Board. In September 1958, as chairman of the board, he was appointed by Jumabhoy Mohamed Jumabhoy, then the Minister for Commerce and Industry, to a 13-man panel to "assist the protection advisory committee in carrying out the new policy of protection for local industries." Cresson quit the British Red Cross Society with deputy president Tan Ah Tah in March 1959, with Dr. C. J. Poh, the appointed acting director, claiming that the two had resigned over "domestic trouble" within the branch. The following month, Jumabhoy appointed him the chairman of a three-man committee formed to decide if the local soap industry should receive government protection. Cresson's four-year tenure as chairman of the Singapore Polytechnic's Board of Governors ended in July.

In addition to Cresson rubber blocks, Cresson also invented Cressonite flooring and wall covering, which he claimed sold "piecemeal" internationally. The flooring was installed in the Supreme Court building and the MacDonald House in Singapore, as well as in railway stations across Malaysia. He also invented the first rubber latex paints, which were applied on the walls of the Empress Place Building and the Sea View Hotel. He later sold this patent to the American Paint Works. He also discovered a method by which he could "convert solvent extraction of gutta percha to a water floatation method in rubber tapping", which was half as costly as previously used methods.

== Personal life and death ==
Cresson announced his engagement to Myra Isabelle Chamarette in November 1925. They married at the Cathedral of the Good Shepherd in January of the following year. Shortly after Cresson became the president of the Rotary Club of Singapore, Myra was officially installed as the president of the Inner Wheel Club of Singapore, which was also known as the "Women's Rotary". After retiring, both Cresson and Myra remained "away from the limelight." Cresson died on 24 August 1990, after which his body at the Mount Vernon Crematorium and Columbarium Complex.
