= THH =

THH may refer to:

- Hillingdon Hospital, west London, England (opened 1838)
- Tetrahydroharmine, a fluorescent alkaloid chemical
- Thomas Henry Huxley (1825–1895), English biologist
- The Helping Hand (halfway house), a rehab in Singapore
- Topological Hochschild homology, in abstract algebra
- The Haunted House (anime), a South Korean TV series (2016–2024)
- Danganronpa: Trigger Happy Havoc, a 2010 video game

== See also ==
- Haunted house (disambiguation)
