= Jewish Welfare Board =

Jewish Welfare Board may refer to:

- National Jewish Welfare Board, a U.S. organisation
- Jewish Welfare Board, a UK organisation, since 1990 part of the charity Jewish Care
- Jewish Welfare Board (Singapore); see List of voluntary welfare organisations in Singapore
