= Helping Hand =

Helping Hand or Helping Hands may refer to:

== Film and television ==
- Helping Hands (film), a 1941 Our Gang short comedy film
- "Helping Hand" (Body of Proof), a 2011 television episode
- "Helping Hand" (Gunsmoke), a 1956 television episode
- "Helping Hand" an episode of Wizards of Waverly Place
- The Helping Hand (1908 American film), a silent film
- The Helping Hand (1908 French film), a silent film

== Songs ==
- "Helping Hand", a song by Billy Joe Royal, from his 1969 album Cherry Hill Park
- "Helping Hand" (song), a song by Screaming Jets, from their 1992 album Tear of Thought
- "Helping Hand", a song by Amy Grant, from her 1994 album House of Love
- "Helping Hands", a song by Quiet Riot, from QR III

== Other ==
- Helping Hand, the mascot of Hamburger Helper
- Solidarity Helping Hand, a welfare organisation affiliated with the South African trade union Solidarity
- The Helping Hand (halfway house), a voluntary welfare organization in Singapore
- Helping hand (tool), a type of jig used in soldering and craftwork
- Helping Hand Party, a minor British Columbia political party
- Wegmans employees that maintain the appearance and safety of the parking lot, vestibule and landscaped areas; gather shopping carts, and lend a “helping hand” by walking customers to their vehicles, and helping them load there groceries into the vehicle.

== See also ==
- "Helping Handis", a 2006 episode of American Dad!
