= Myra Cresson =

Singaporean Social Worker

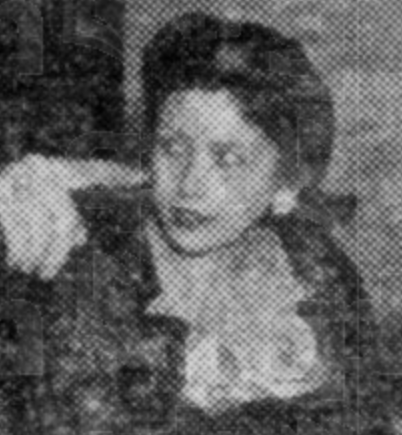
Cresson in 1948

Myra Isabelle Cresson (née Chamarette; 2 November 1904–2005) was a social worker in Singapore. She served as the president of the Inner Wheel Club of Singapore and as the Colony Commissioner of the Singapore Girl Guides Association.

== Early life and education ==
Cresson was born at the Queen Mary Hospital in Hong Kong on 2 November 1904 to a French father and a Portuguese mother living in Macau. She was the younger of two daughters. She and her family moved to Hong Kong, where they remained for several years before moving again to Prinsep Street in Singapore. They later moved to a house on Bencoolen Street. She received her education at the Convent of the Holy Infant Jesus.

== Career ==
Cresson was appointed the chairman of the Good Shepherd Convent fancy fair committee, which was established to aid the Good Shepherd Convent's building fund. On 5 August 1948, she was officially appointed the president of the Singaporean branch of the Inner Wheel Club for the wives, sisters, unmarried daughters, mothers and widows of the Rotary Club of Singapore, of which she was a founding member. Her husband was the Rotary Club's president. She served as the club's president until 1949, and was again appointed its president in 1951, serving until the following year. In the absence of Lady Gimson, she acted as the president of the Voluntary Workers of the Children's Social Centres. She also served as the chairman of the committee of the Department of Social Welfare. She was conferred the MBE in 1952 for her contributions to social work in Singapore.

In 1952, Cresson was appointed the founding president of the Girl Guides' Central Local Association. In 1957 she became the first Singaporean Colony Commissioner of the Singapore Girl Guides Association. She served as the association's president until February 1959.

== Personal life ==
Cresson married Lionel Cresson in 1926 and moved to Pasir Panjang. Cresson died in 2005.
