= Focus on the Family Singapore =

Christian socially conservative organisation

- Formation: August 2000
- Founder: Tan Thuan Seng
- Registration no.: 200108115N
- Location: Singapore
- CEO: Delia Ng
- Website: family.org.sg

Focus on the Family Singapore (FOTF Singapore) is an affiliate of the American Christian fundamentalist parachurch organisation, Focus on the Family that was established in 2000.

== History ==
Focus on the Family Singapore was established in 2000 as an affiliate of the American Christian fundamentalist church, Focus on the Family.

In 2009, Focus on the Family Singapore received S$45,477 in grants from the larger American organisation, though it remains operationally and legally independent from the group.

=== Background (United States) ===
Focus on the Family is an American Evangelical Protestant organisation founded in 1977 in Southern California by James Dobson, based in Colorado Springs, Colorado. Dobson and his organisation took a different approach to ministry than many other evangelical parachurch organisations, opting to combine parenting programs with conservative political activism. It lobbies against LGBT rights, labelling them a "particularly evil lie of Satan". The organisation also seeks to change public policy in the areas of sex education, creationism, abortion, state-sponsored school prayer, gambling, drugs, and gender roles.

In 2017, Vice President of the United States Mike Pence attended the organisation's 40th anniversary celebration, stating that President Donald Trump was an ally of the organisation and that the Trump administration supported Focus on the Family's goals, including the abolition of Planned Parenthood.

== Advocacy ==
From 2002 to 2009, FOTF ran sex education workshops in 44 schools, mostly run by the Ministry of Education, adopting a curriculum that discouraged pre-marital sex, abortion, and the use of contraceptives, whilst promoting abstinence before marriage. In 2010, following new UNESCO guidelines for sex education, the Ministry of Education conducted a review of external workshop providers to be engaged in schools, winnowing the list of vendors to six, including FOTF.

In the early 2010s, Focus on the Family Singapore had been appointed by the Ministry of Social and Family Development to conduct such modules for junior college students. On 7 October 2014, a Hwa Chong Institution student who attended a relationship workshop, revealed that the program portrayed girls as "emotional", "want(ing) security" and wanting to "look attractive", whilst depicting boys as "need(ing) respect" and not "want(ing) a girlfriend that questions their opinions and argues with their decisions all the time". The programme material also featured lines such as "a guy can’t not want to look" and suggested that girls indulge in doublespeak while boys mean exactly what they say. The program was subsequently criticised for contributing to rape culture, with FOTF spokespersons responding that their workshops had been based on "experts" such as Christian pastor Gary Chapman and Christian author Shaunti Feldhahn.

On 17 October 2014, a letter signed by 13 research scientists from National University of Singapore and Yale-NUS noted that there was no evidence to support the claims of psychological sex differences that were espoused in the workshops. The Ministry of Education confirmed in July 2014 that relationship and sexuality programs conducted in schools by FOTF Singapore would cease by the end of 2014.

The group runs conversion therapy seminars and counselling programs. It advocates for heterosexual marriages and traditional family values. In 2015, they advocated for gay American singer Adam Lambert to be barred from performing at the national New Year countdown due to his purported history of "sexually provocative acts".

== Events ==
In 2000, FOTF SG became a registered charity, later registering as a private social service agency and Institution of Public Character.

In 2008, FOTF was featured on a DBS advertising campaign that stated it would donate funds to the charity, before backtracking on the feature, noting that it had acted based on the fact that the Ministry of Community Development and National Council of Social Service had endorsed the charity. They later stated that the bank's intention was to support child welfare in Asia and not the political stances of FOTF, instead making a donation to FOTF SG's centre for children with learning disabilities.

The charity organises parent-child bonding programmes with prison inmates. It also organises marriage preparation programmes and programmes for married couples.

== Management ==
Chair of the Board of directors
Name	Duration	Notes
Tan Thuan Seng	2002-2013	
Jason Wong	2014-2021	
Tony Soh	2021-2024	
Andrew Kwan	2024-Present	Both serving as co-chairman
Choe Peng Sum	2024-Present	Both serving as co-chairman

The current CEO of the organisation is Delia Ng, who was appointed in 2023.

The organisation underwent restructuring in 2012, and no longer has the president serve as head of the organisation. Jason Wong, former Singapore Prisons Service deputy director and NGO Honour Singapore board member, became Chairman in October 2013.
