= Singapore Cancer Society =

- Founded: 1964
- Registration no.: S65SS0033F
- Purpose: "To be the leading charitable cancer organisation in Singapore and the region, with a reputation for effective programmes for the prevention and control of cancer."
- Location: Singapore
- Region served: Singapore
- Key people: Wee Leong How (Chairman); Ravindran Kanesvaran (Vice Chairman); Albert Ching (CEO)
- Website: http://www.singaporecancersociety.org.sg/

The Singapore Cancer Society (SCS), founded in 1964, is the largest cancer advocacy and support organisation in Singapore.

== History ==
Established in 1964, Singapore Cancer Society is a self-funded voluntary welfare organisation which is dedicated to minimize the impact of cancer in Singapore through the provision of cancer treatment subsidies, financial and welfare aid to needy cancer patients, home hospice care services for terminally-ill cancer patients, as well as rehabilitation support programs for recovering cancer patients and cancer survivors.

The organization was formed by the members of the Lions Club, the Jaycees and the Rotary Club of Singapore West.

In addition, the Society also provides free cancer screening services and promotes cancer awareness and prevention through its public education and community outreach programmes. Annually, the SCS helps more than 2,000 needy cancer patients and reaches out to more than 100,000 individuals through its cancer screening, public educational and community outreach programmes.

== See also ==
- List of voluntary welfare organisations in Singapore
- Norwegian Cancer Society

== Sources ==
- Cancer in Asia: Opportunities for Prevention, Detection, and Treatment. (1976). Japan: University Park Press.
- The SAGE Encyclopedia of Cancer and Society. (2015). United States: SAGE Publications.
- Cancer Education in Schools: A Guidebook for Teachers. (1978). Germany: International Union Against Cancer.
