= Hair for Hope =

Charity event in Singapore

- Industry: Charity Fundraising Event
- Founded: Singapore, 2003
- Founder: Children's Cancer Foundation
- Headquarters: Singapore
- Website: www.hairforhope.org.sg

Hair for Hope is a charity event in which participants have their heads shaven in order to raise funds for the Children's Cancer Foundation whose mission is to "improving the quality of life of children with cancer and their families through enhancing their emotional, social, and medical well-being."

== Description ==
Hair for Hope is an annual fundraising initiative, organized by the Children's Cancer Foundation, in order to raise funds and awareness of childhood cancer in Singapore. Participants who volunteer to join their cause will shave their heads bald. It is the only head-shaving event in Singapore and through this gesture, Hair for Hope aims to accomplish the following goals as mentioned below:

1. Create awareness of childhood cancer in Singapore
2. Show children with cancer and their families that they are not alone in their fight against cancer
3. Tell children with cancer that it is OK to be bald
4. Raise funds and help children with cancer and with their families
5. Build a community of support for children with cancer and their families

Hair for Hope believes every shaven head symbolizes the understanding of the difficulties faced by a child with cancer. The act of shaving helps to increase awareness of childhood cancer and also presents itself as a chance to amass monetary support from the public.

== Origin ==
In 2003, nine Children's Cancer Foundation volunteers decided to shave their heads to help garner support for children with cancer during Tulip Hearts Day, an annual Children's Cancer Foundation fundraising event, with the help of Lush Hair Creation's hair stylists. $2000 in donation was raised towards Children's Cancer Foundation. The idea for Hair for Hope was born. On 27 August 2004, Hair for Hope was officially launched involving 73 volunteers raising up to $48,000 for Children's Cancer Foundation beneficiaries.

== Works ==
Being an initiative of the Children's Cancer Foundation, Hair for Hope began in 2004. Hair for Hope has both raised money for the Children's Cancer Foundation's beneficiaries and increased awareness for the foundation as well as Children's Cancer.

Participants garner pledges for the cause with many individuals and groups signing up to give their support for the cause. They then have their heads shaven at the annual event typically held at the end of July. Hair for Hope also partners with many organisations who support the event through providing participants as well as other means. Hair from volunteers are also used to make wigs to raise funds too.

Having grown beyond a single event, there are now many satellite events held under the Hair for Hope banner. These events are organised by both public and private organisations and are non-concurrent to the main event. Venues are usually provided free by the organisers and hair salons, such as Jean Yip Group and Next Hair Salon, provided their services for free also.

Hair for Hope established the Hair for Hope Facebook page and Twitter account in April 2011 and Instagram account, more recently, in November 2014.

== Reception ==
Since its inception in 2003 with only nine volunteers to shaving their heads and raising S$2,000 for the event, it has grown to 6656 shavees and achieved more than S$3.29 million in 2014. It has branched out and reached 53 satellite events organized by 33 corporate offices, 13 schools, and seven grassroot organizations. In 2011, the event saw 547 females shave their heads, out of the 4238 shavees.

== Other countries ==
In 2013, Premi Mathew, a breast cancer survivor, launched Hair for Hope India to donate hair for cancer patients in India. In June 2021, during the COVID-19 pandemic, the organisation launched the first global Cut-a-thon, which was held live via Zoom. About 120 people participated in the event.

== Incident ==
In 2013, three out of five St Margaret's Secondary School female students, who took part in the Hair for Hope, attended school without wearing wigs as promised to their school administration. They were then instructed by their principal to wear a wig to school. They were then accompanied by a parent volunteer to buy a wig. This drew criticism from netizens on the principal's actions as this goes against the spirit of Hair for Hope. After discussions with the school administration and the girls, the Education Minister at the time, Heng Swee Keat announced that the students will not have to wear a wig.
