= Singapore Association for the Deaf =

Charity in Singapore

- Abbreviation: SADeaf
- Formation: 1955; 71 years ago
- Registration no.: S62SS0061C
- Legal status: Charity
- Headquarters: 254 Outram Road; Singapore 169051

The Singapore Association for the Deaf (SADeaf) is a charitable organisation for the deaf and hard-of-hearing in Singapore founded in 1955. SADeaf is a member of the National Council of Social Service and the World Federation of the Deaf. SADeaf is also supported by the Ministry of Education and the Ministry of Social and Family Development.

== History ==
=== 1955–1999 ===
In 1955, the Singapore Association for the Deaf (SADeaf) was founded and they established the Singapore School for the Deaf in 1963.

In 1972, the Youth Group for the Deaf was formed, which organized recreational activities, and two years later, the Total Communication (TC) philosophy was adopted. In 1978, the Signing Exact English (SEE) system was adopted by SADeaf's affiliated schools. On 29 September 1983, SADeaf joined the Community Chest of Singapore.

In 1988, the Centre for the Hearing-Impaired and Audiological Services Clinic were set up. In 1990, the Deaf Access Committee was established and a book about sign language titled, "Sign for Singapore", was also released.

=== 2000–present ===
In 2000, a Hearing Care Centre was opened. In 2004, an Itinerant Support Service was set up to help provide emotional and learning support for deaf students in mainstream schools. In 2007, SADeaf launched a new logo. In 2011, SADeaf worked on a Mini Enabling Masterplan which focuses on helping the deaf and hard-of-hearing community in Singapore. The following year, SADeaf launched a free interpretation service for members. SADeaf also hosted the World Federation of the Deaf Regional Secretariat in Asia (WRD RSA), the first time Singapore would host this meeting.

In 2015, SADeaf held its 3rd Deaf Dialogue session in January and celebrated its 60th anniversary. In 2016, SADeaf was a recipient of the Charity Transparency Award and also raised public awareness at the Singapore National Day Parade and one of Lee Hsien Loong's speeches.

In 2020, during the COVID-19 pandemic, SADeaf helped release special masks to help deaf and hard-of-hearing people to lip read better along with making it easier for deaf people during COVID-19.

SADeaf won the Charity Transparency Award again in 2022.

== See also ==
- List of disability organisations in Singapore
- List of voluntary welfare organisations in Singapore
