= Olive Hilda Miller =

Caymanian journalist and philanthropist

Olive Wright Miller MBE OBE (9 November 1921 – 19 May 2020) was a British missionary, journalist and philanthropist. Known as "Cayman's own Mother Teresa", she was the Cayman Islands' first paid journalist and established its first retirement home.

== Biography ==
Olive Hilda Miller was born in Essex, England, on 9 November 1921. In 1946, Miller travelled to Jamaica as a missionary for the Church of Scotland. During her time as a missionary, she was based in Jamaica, but made periodic trips to the Cayman Islands, where in 1946, she founded a branch of what was to become the Girls Brigade. In 1949, she co-founded and taught at Cayman High School. In 1953, she married Caymanian Ray Miller in England, but they returned to Grand Cayman in 1957. They had a son and a daughter, Kathryn and Nigel.

Miller was the first paid news reporter in the Cayman Islands, starting work in 1964 on the Tradewinds newspaper, which her work helped to establish. In October 1965, she moved to the Caymanian Weekly. For eleven years, from 1970 to her retirement in 1981 she worked as Cayman's first government information officer.

In 1975, she was a founding member of the National Council of Voluntary Organisations in Cayman. From 1978, she served as a Justice of the peace, specialising in juvenile cases. She was the first manager of The Pines, the first retirement home to be built in the Cayman Islands. She worked there from 1983 until 1991.

In 1980, with Evelyn Andersen, she founded the Pink Ladies Volunteer Corps, and in 1994 organised Cayman's first annual 'Glamorous Granny' competition. In 2011, she published her first book Cayman Rhyme Time, a children's book which features traditional songs from the islands.

Miller died on 19 May 2020 at The Pines. On 20 May 2020, the Cayman Islands National Flag was flown at half-mast on all government buildings. She was described by The Cayman Compass as "Cayman's own Mother Teresa".

== Awards ==
- Queen's Certificate and Badge of Honour (1967)
- Member of the Order of the British Empire (1977)
- Vice-Patron – Brigade International (1983)
- Listed as one of five "Distinguished Women of History" on the Cayman Islands (2003)
- Spirit of Excellence Award (2009)
- Golden Apple Lifetime Achievement Award (2010)
- Officer of the Order of the British Empire (2018)
