= Girls' Brigade =

International Christian youth organization

The Girls' Brigade is an international, interdenominational Christian youth organisation founded in 1893 in Dublin, Ireland. The modern Brigade was formed as the result of the consolidation of three organisations.

The Queen Mother and Princess Alice were Girls' Brigade patrons until their deaths in 2002 and 2004, respectively. From 1983 until her death in 2020, Olive Hilda Miller was Vice-Patron of Brigade International.

== Crest ==
In the centre is a cross, the symbol of Christianity. Below the cross is a lamp, which represents the Girls' Brigade. Above it is a crown, symbolising monarchy in general and Christ the King in particular. Behind it all is a torch; fire is a typical sign in Christianity of God's presence.

In 1965, when the Girls' Brigade, the Girls' Guildry and the Girls' Life Brigade combined into the modern Girls' Brigade, a competition was held to design the crest for the amalgamated organisation. Constance Fasham, the winner of the competition, incorporated symbols from each partner organisation: the cross from the Ireland Girls' Brigade, the lamp from the Girls' Guildry, and the crown from the Girls' Life Brigade.

Fasham intended the crest to incorporate symbols from the three original organisations. The crest was intended therefore as a symbol of Unity and Christian faith.

== International ==
The Girls' Brigade operates internationally and is divided into five Fellowships: African, Asian, Caribbean and Americas, European, and Pacific. International conferences have been held every four years since 1998. Conferences were held in Australia in 1988, Thailand in 2002, Northern Ireland in 2006, Malaysia in 2010, Australia in 2014, and Zambia in 2018. The international headquarters are currently based in Derbyshire, England. The International President of the Girls' Brigade is Priscilla Penny (Africa). The International Treasurer is Betty McComb (England and Wales). The International Vice-presidents are the Chairholders from each Fellowship.

African Fellowship

Aruk Omori is the International Vice President for Africa.
There are 12 African countries that have Girls' Brigade companies:

- Botswana
- Ghana
- Kenya
- Nigeria
- Malawi
- Sierra Leone
- South Africa
- Swaziland
- Tanzania
- Uganda
- Zambia
- Zimbabwe

=== Asian Fellowship ===
Nancy Shaw is the International Vice President for Asia.
There are five Asian countries that have Girls' Brigade companies:

- Hong Kong
- Malaysia
- Philippines
- Singapore
- Thailand

=== Caribbean and Americas Fellowship ===
Quindell Ferguson is the International Vice President for Caribbean & Americas.
There are 17 countries in the Americas that have Girls' Brigade companies:

- Anguilla
- Antigua
- Bahamas
- British Virgin Islands
- Canada
- Cayman Islands
- Dominica
- Guyana
- Jamaica
- Montserrat
- Nevis
- Sint Eustatius
- Saint Kitts
- Saint Martin
- Saint Vincent
- Trinidad and Tobago
- United States

=== Europe Fellowship ===
Amelia Heaford is the International Vice President for Europe.

There are four countries within the Europe fellowship that have Girls' Brigade companies:

- England and Wales
- Republic of Ireland
- Northern Ireland
- Scotland

Currently, England & Wales run as one country for Girls' Brigade even though they are distinct countries.

=== Pacific Fellowship ===
Kaylene Trembath is the International Vice President for the Pacific.
There are eight countries within the Pacific Fellowship that have Girls' Brigade companies:

- Australia (3,051)
- Cook Islands (355)
- New Zealand (1,907)
- Niue (161)
- Papua New Guinea (435)
- Solomon Islands (3,299)
- Tonga (114)
- Vanuatu (75)

== See also ==
- Boys' Brigade
- Girls' Brigade Singapore
