= Archdiocesan Commission for the Pastoral Care of Migrants and Itinerant People =

Catholic non-profit organization in Singapore

- Abbreviation: ACMI
- Formation: June 15, 1998; 28 years ago
- Type: Charity
- Registration no.: T16CC0006L
- Headquarters: 04-01, Agape Village, 319264, 7 Lor 8 Toa Payoh, 319252
- Location: Singapore
- Coordinates: 1.3401°N 103.8571°E
- Website: acmi.org.sg

The Archdiocesan Commission for the Pastoral Care of Migrants and Itinerant People (ACMI) is a Catholic non-profit social service organization in Singapore that helps and supports migrant workers in Singapore. Co-founded and chaired in 1998 by Bridget Tan, ACMI was founded after being commissioned to help migrants and itinerant people in Singapore.

== Programmes and services ==
ACMI has worked on their community outreach by providing Skills Development Programmes for migrant workers regardless of race, language, or religion.

Services that ACMI performs include:

- Case Management and Counseling
- Educational and Vocational Treatment
- Pastoral Care and Formation Programmes
- Educational Sponsorship for non-Singaporean children
- Public Education

== History ==
ACMI was co-founded in May 1998 by Singaporean activist Bridget Tan after being commissioned by the Catholic church. She later left the organization after a lack of support from the church.

In 2016, ACMI became registered as a charity under the Charities Act.

In 2021, ACMI was selected as one of the charities to receive a special charity donation from KK Christmas.

== See also ==
- List of social service agencies in Singapore
- HOME
