= Cambridge Institute (Singapore) =

Cambridge Institute is a private post-secondary school in Singapore. It is established in 1996 and now has 2,000 full-time students and 150 staff. It has no connection with Cambridge University (UK). The main campus is in the city's central business district, with two branches elsewhere.

It has been awarded the Singapore Quality Class (SQC) for Private Education Organizations, and its native-speaker language teachers have been approved by the Singapore Ministry of Education (MOE). SQC is an initiative under the Singapore Government's Education Excellence Framework.

The school has overseas representative offices in Hanoi (Vietnam) and Shenyang (China).

A Student Protection Scheme is in place, as stipulated by the Consumers Association of Singapore (CASE). As one of the largest operators in the private education sector, Cambridge Institute has welcomed government proposals for new stricter regulation of such schools, following a spate of sudden closures of private schools. Edwin Chan, Principal of Cambridge Institute, said it was "high time" the rules were made stricter.

== Academics ==
The school offers full-time language courses in General English (six levels), Conversational English, Business English, and Chinese. 17 other languages are offered as part-time courses.

International Diploma programmes are offered in vocational areas such as Education, Hotel and Tourism Management, Business Management and Marketing, and Accountancy. These diplomas are awarded by external institutions such as Edith Cowan University (Australia), Southern Institute of Technology (New Zealand), and London Centre of Marketing. These are full-time post-'O'-level (or equivalent) courses for which students must be at least 16.

GCE 'O' level courses are offered to students aged 16–25 to prepare for direct entry to government polytechnics or Junior Colleges in Singapore (a part-time evening course).

Trips to many places of interest are organised to enhance the learning process and provide for a more enjoyable educational experience.

The school is responsible to the Immigration and Checkpoints Authority for ensuring that foreign students residing temporarily in Singapore on a Student Pass complete their studies. Therefore, the most serious offences are truancy and skipping classes. Students who commit these offences receive corporal punishment (caning) and if they repeatedly do so they will be dismissed from the school and repatriated to their home countries.

== Debt crisis ==
As of October 2011, the Cambridge Institute has been running up hundreds of thousands of dollars in debt. Cambridge Institute has had to transfer nearly all of its students to other schools and stop taking in new ones, after it was forced to temporarily close its five Singapore campuses because it could not pay the rent.

Two teachers have successfully sued it for unpaid salary at the Labour Court and nine more cases are pending. It is a dramatic turnaround in fortune for Cambridge Institute. Teachers also complained that the school continued hiring even though it was in financial trouble.

== See also ==
- List of schools in Singapore
