= Bridget Tan =

Singaporean activist (1948–2022)

- 陈得心
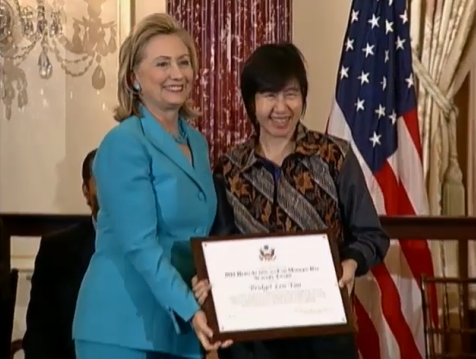
- Tan (right) receiving the Hero Acting to End Modern-Day Slavery Award from Hillary Clinton in 2011
- Born: 29 September 1948; Singapore
- Died: 18 April 2022 (aged 73); Batam, Indonesia

Bridget Lew Tan (Chinese: 陈得心; pinyin: Chén Déxīn; 29 September 1948 – 18 April 2022) was a Singaporean migrant workers' rights advocate and the founder of the Humanitarian Organization for Migration Economics (HOME). After retiring from a career in the private sector, Tan began volunteering with the Archdiocesan Commission for the Pastoral Care of Migrants and Itinerant People (ACMI), which she chaired. She left ACMI after it declined to support some of Tan's initiatives, and in 2004 she founded HOME, which provides services for and advocates on behalf of migrant workers. That same year she founded a sister organization in Indonesia, Yayasan Dunia Viva Wanita (Indonesian for World Foundation For Women).

For her work, Tan was honored by the Asia Society, the United States Department of State, and the governments of Thailand and the Philippines.

== Advocacy ==
In 1998, Tan helped found the Roman Catholic ACMI. She joined the initiative at the request of a Catholic priest, Father Andy Altamirano; he approached Tan about the initiative in 1997, and died shortly after the commission was founded. Tan became the initiative's chair, a volunteer position. In a 2011 interview, Tan expressed that she "felt the call of God" when Father Altamirano asked for her to become involved in the commission. With ACMI, Tan set up food, shelter, and training programs. Tan later left the ACMI due to the Church's refusal to support its programs.

Tan founded the HOME in 2004, using her own personal funds. The organization provides temporary room and board, medical, legal, and financial assistance, and job skills training to migrant workers that have been abused or exploited by their employers or by the agents that recruit migrant workers. Since its founding, the organization has expanded its focus, and now also works to support victims of the sex trade and to combat human trafficking. The organization also engages in advocacy efforts. Tan worked for HOME without pay until 2012, at which point the paid role of chief executive officer was created, and Tan assumed the role.

In 2004, Tan also founded Yayasan Dunia Viva Wanita (Indonesian for World Foundation For Women), a women's shelter in Sekupang, Batam, Indonesia. HOME's website lists Yayasan Dunia Viva Wanita as its "cross border partner", and the organizations collaborated in 2012 on a survey of sex workers in Batam.

== Awards and honours ==
In late 2010, Tan traveled to Jakarta, Indonesia to represent HOME, which had been selected by the Asia Society for the 2010 Asia Society-Bank of America Merrill Lynch Asia 21 Young Leaders Public Service Award. Also in 2010, Tan was nominated for the Reader's Digest Asian of the Year award, and received an honorable mention.

For her advocacy work, Tan received a Hero Acting to End Modern-Day Slavery Award from then United States Secretary of State Hillary Clinton at a June 2011 ceremony surrounding the release of the United States Department of State's 2011 Trafficking in Persons Report. She was also mentioned in Secretary of State Clinton's presentation, where Tan's work with the ACMI was highlighted. The governments of Thailand and The Philippines have also honored Tan for her work.

She was inducted into the Singapore Women's Hall of Fame in 2015.

== Personal life ==
Bridget Tan was born in 1948, the third of four children. Her father was a doctor and her mother was a homemaker. Tan attended CHIJ Katong Convent, a Catholic girls' school. Tan worked in human resources in the private sector until her retirement at age 55. Tan was the mother of twins – a son who is a physician and a daughter who is a psychologist.

In February 2014, Tan, who was diabetic and had high blood pressure, suffered a stroke. She had emergency surgery and spent two months in Changi General Hospital. Her first public appearance after the stroke came in December, when she attended a ceremony commemorating the ten year anniversary of HOME. After suffering the stroke, Tan relocated to the Yayasan Dunia Viva Wanita house in Batam; she continued to direct the charitable organizations she was involved in.

Tan died on 18 April 2022, aged 73.
