= Humanitarian Organization for Migration Economics =

Singaporean non-governmental organization

- Abbreviation: HOME
- Founder: Bridget Tan
- Registration no.: T04SS0193H
- Location: Singapore
- President of the Board: Ng Kok Hoe
- Executive Director: Stephanie Chok
- Affiliations: Yayasan Dunia Viva Wanita (Sister organization)
- Website: www.home.org.sg

Humanitarian Organization for Migration Economics (HOME) is a Singaporean non-governmental organization that provides services to, and advocates on behalf of, migrant workers. It was founded in 2004 by Bridget Tan.

== Founding ==
The Humanitarian Organization for Migration Economics was founded by Bridget Tan in September 2004. Tan had previously co-founded and led the Roman Catholic Archdiocesan Commission for the Pastoral Care of Migrants and Itinerant People (ACMI), but left ACMI due to a lack of support from the Church. Tan used her retirement funds to launch HOME.

== Activities ==
The organization provides temporary room and board, medical, legal, and financial assistance, and job skills training to migrant workers that have been financially, emotionally, or sexually abused by their employers or by the agents that recruit migrant workers. HOME also operates a telephone help line and a weekly help desk. Since its founding, the organization has expanded its focus, and now also works to support victims of the sex trade and to combat human trafficking.

In addition to directly serving migrant workers, the organization also works with Singaporean government agencies to help shape policy on migrant workers, sex workers, and human trafficking. HOME holds regular meetings with the Singaporean government's Ministry of Manpower, and also advocates for policy changes publicly. HOME advocates for migrant workers to have regularly scheduled time off, better pay, and equal pay for migrants from different countries. In 2012, it joined with five other non-governmental organizations to criticize an anti-trafficking bill being discussed in Parliament for being too heavily focused on prevention and not focused enough on protecting migrant worker rights, as well as for focusing overly on women trafficked for the sex trade, to the detriment of other victims of trafficking. Home also publishes editorials through the website The Online Citizen.

Humanitarian Organization for Migration Economics conducts research on issues that affect the people it serves. In 2012, HOME collaborated with Yayasan Lintas Nusa and Yayasan Dunia Viva Wanita, the latter a women's shelter in Batam, Indonesia that was also founded by Bridget Tan, on a survey of Indonesian sex workers. The survey found evidence of inconsistent condom use and a significant number of sex tourists from Singapore. In 2015, HOME released a study that found that migrant workers had a significantly higher risk of mental health problems, and recommended better rest, nutrition, and social conditions to help curb the risk.

== Collaborations ==
HOME has worked with local artists to create awareness and source aid through crowd funding. In 2017 they worked with international artist Nicola Anthony to raise awareness about migrant workers who needed public help to crowd fund for the cost of their medical bills. Nicola Anthony created three artworks which were exhibited at Singapore Art Museum, telling the stories of three exploited migrant workers. As a result, HOME were able to collect $5000 to cover one year's medical expenses for Wang, (who was repatriated to his home country after suffering a work-related stroke).

== Accolades ==
In 2010, HOME was selected by the Asia Society as the recipient of the Asia Society-Bank of America Merrill Lynch Asia 21 Young Leaders Public Service Award. Bridget Tan has also been personally recognized for the work that she did as part of HOME, and received a Hero Acting to End Modern-Day Slavery Award from then United States Secretary of State Hillary Clinton at a June 2011 ceremony surrounding the release of the Department of State's 2011 Trafficking in Persons Report.
