= Pathlight School =

School for autistic children in Singapore

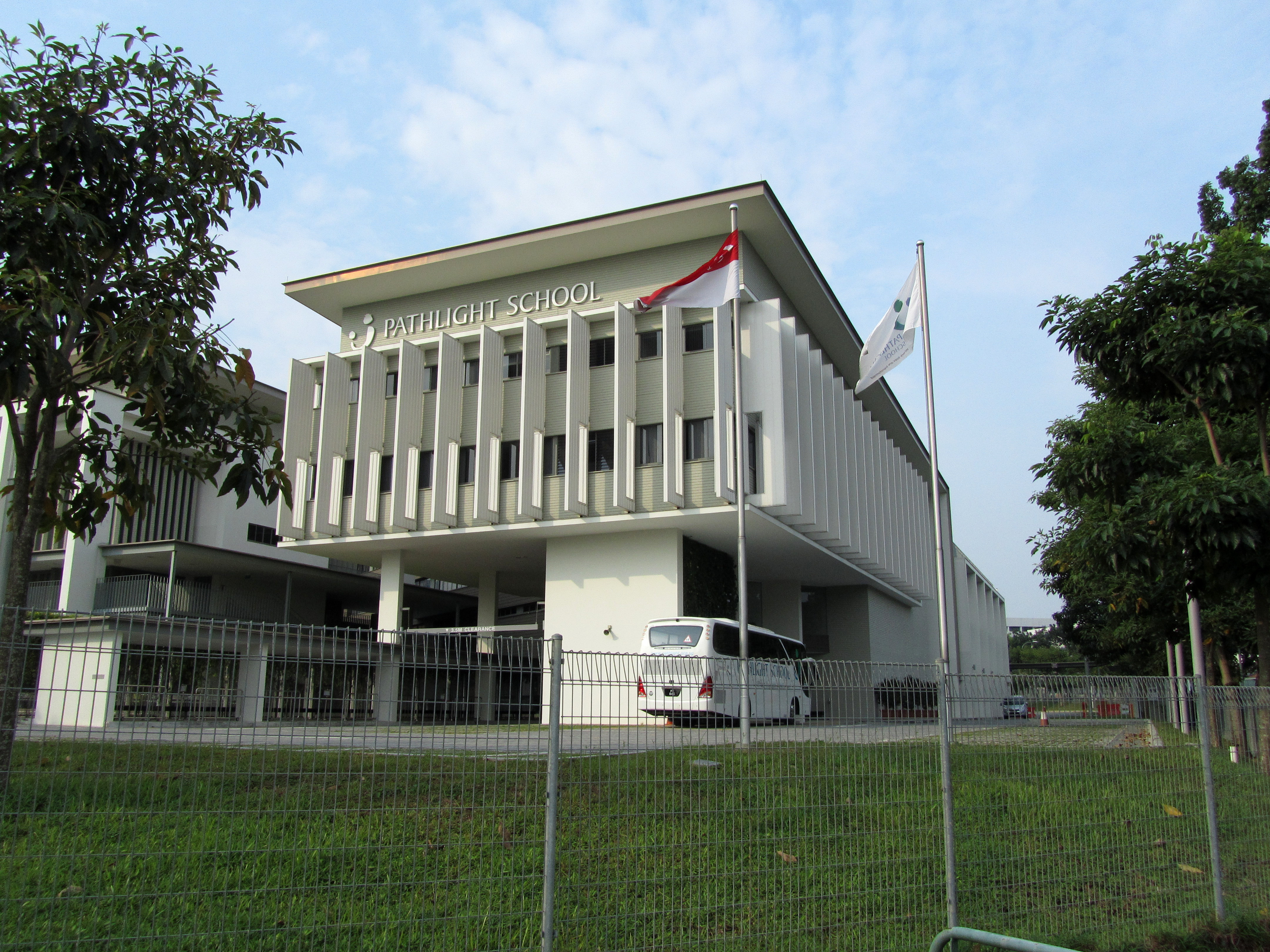
- Pathlight School Campus 1 in 2011

Location
- 5 Ang Mo Kio Ave 10; 569739; Singapore

Information
- Type: Public; Special education
- Established: January 2004; 22 years ago
- Chairman: Kang Puay Seng
- Principal: Linda Kho Ai Ling
- Age: 7 to 18–21
- Enrolment: 2042 (January 2024)
- Slogan: The Learning Journey (2004–2009); Where lives are transformed (2010–present)
- Website: www.pathlight.org.sg

Pathlight School is a special school for children with autism in Singapore. Founded in 2004, it is run by the non-profit Autism Resource Centre and comprises one half of the national educational provision for autistic children. The school educates students in social and life skills, teaches them mainstream curriculum subjects and prepares them for employment in an autism-friendly environment.

== History ==
In 2003, the Autism Resource Centre (ARC) collaborated with the Rainbow Centre to establish a school for autistic children. It opened in January 2004, named Pathlight School, with 10 teachers and 41 students.

In 2007, two teachers from Pathlight School won the inaugural Most Outstanding Special Education Teacher Award and Most Innovative Special Education Teacher Award, given by the Singaporean Ministry of Education and National Council of Social Service. In 2009, the Autism Association of Singapore launched a second autism-focused special school, Eden School, and the two schools formed a partnership. The following year, Pathlight School moved to its permanent campus and announced plans to develop student internship programmes, build an information technology centre, and set up a lifelong learning club for alumni.

== Campus ==
The permanent campus of Pathlight School at Ang Mo Kio Avenue 10, which was constructed by W Architects and cost S$34 million to build, spans 1.6 hectares (16,000 m^{2}; 0.0062 sq mi). Its facilities include 45 classrooms, four computer labs, three courtyards, an industrial kitchen and a multi-purpose area, as well as special art, music and design rooms.

In November 2025, Pathlight officially opened its third campus in Tampines, it now has an enrollment of 300 students, and can take in up to 800 students. The campus is meant to be a space that tests and refines ideas for Pathlight's Ang Mo Kio campuses and future sites. Key features of the Tampines campus include a canteen run by an ARC social enterprise, where senior students and alumni can learn to operate food production technology. It also has a studio apartment on campus for students to practice independent living skills. A fourth campus is being built in Punggol, slated to open in 2032.

== Programmes ==
Unlike most special schools in Singapore, which place a lighter emphasis on academics, Pathlight School uses the same academic curriculum as mainstream primary and secondary schools. An exception is that mother tongue lessons are replaced with classes covering social and life skills. The school accommodates the needs of students with smaller class sizes, staff trained to handle autistic children, more visual teaching methods, more predictable environments and individual education plans for each student.

Satellite classes and special events give students regular opportunities to interact with non-autistic peers from mainstream schools; exceptional students are allowed to attend classes with mainstream students for some subjects. To prepare students for employment, Pathlight School runs computing courses, a design studio and a cafe staffed by students. The school also produces book compilations of thoughts written by students, conducts exhibitions of student artwork and sells merchandise made by students, to help students develop useful skills, raise funds for the school and raise awareness of autism. In addition, Pathlight School has hosted autism events such as the WeCAN Learning Congress 2010.

== Students ==
As of 2010, Pathlight School had an enrolment of over 500 students, of whom about 40% had their school fees of S$500 subsidised. The school caters to students with autism aged 6 to 18, who are able to access the mainstream curriculum because they are high-functioning, but would have difficulty learning in a mainstream school. Most students take mainstream national examinations, such as the PSLE and O Levels, with results comparable to students from mainstream schools, and some enter mainstream tertiary institutions. About 10% of students take a vocational track and may transfer to Eden School, which caters to lower-functioning autistic children and focuses on vocational training. Students from Pathlight School have participated in—and won—national competitions such as the National Youth Business Challenge 2010.

== Management ==
Pathlight School is run by the Autism Resource Centre, a non-profit organisation that also offers early intervention, therapy and training for persons with autism in Singapore. The school employs 81 staff, including teachers and therapists, and the school board is headed by founder, ARC president and Member of Parliament Denise Phua. Operating costs of the school are paid by the Ministry of Education and National Council of Social Service, while other costs, estimated at S$5 million per year, are funded through fees, donations, merchandise sales and fundraising events. Under the partnership between Pathlight School and Eden School, the two schools have a centralised admission system and share various resources; together, they form the national provision of education for children across the autism spectrum.
