= Singapore Association of the Visually Handicapped =

Singaporean charity

- 新加坡视障人士协会
- Abbreviation: SAVH
- Formation: c.1951
- Registration no.: S61SS0119J
- Legal status: Charity
- Purpose: To promote the needs, interests and aspirations of the visually handicapped.
- Headquarters: 47 Toa Payoh Rise, Singapore 298104
- Coordinates: 1.2018°N 103.5023°E
- Website: https://savh.org.sg/
- Formerly called: Singapore Association for the Blind (SAB)

The Singapore Association of the Visually Handicapped (SAVH) is a charitable organisation for the blind in Singapore. It was founded in 1951 and was known as the Singapore Association for the Blind. The SAVH is a registered charity and is affiliated with the National Council of Social Service (NCSS) and is an approved Institute of Public Character.

== History ==
=== 1950–1999 ===
In 1956, the Singapore School for the Blind was established.

In 1964, the Subcommittee of the Blind was formed.

In 1967, an Open Education Programme was started at Ahmad Ibrahim Secondary School.

In 1972, the Subcommittee of the Blind was renamed to the White Cane Club.

In 1978, a Low Vision Clinic and Braille & Talking Book Library were opened.

In 1983, the SAVH hosted the Asian Conference on Visual Handicap.

In 1986, the SAVH was funded by the Community Chest of Singapore.

In 1987, the association was renamed from the "Singapore Association for the Blind" to the "Singapore Association of the Visually Handicapped".

In 1990, the Open Education Programme was extended to four additional mainstream schools and the Singapore School for the Visually Handicapped came under the purview of the Ministry of Education.

In 1992, a new programme, TouchArt, was initiated along with a In-House Massage Service.

In 1997, a Mobile Massage Team was formed.

In 1999, the White Cane Club became a branch of the SAVH.

=== 2000–2010 ===
In 2001, the SAVH celebrated its 50th anniversary, and established a Satellite Low Vision Clinic at the Singapore National Eye Centre.

In 2002, Assistive Devices Centres were opened, and the Dining in the Dark Programme was launched.

In 2003, institutional library membership service for home-bound clients was introduced, MP3-format audio books were launched, and Community Outreach Programme were initiated.

In 2005, recording studios were upgraded to include digital capabilities.

In 2007, fundraising concerts "Chorus of Dreams" and "Melodies from the Heart" were held.

In 2008, the SAVH's Bizlink Centre collaboration – Sheltered Workshop for the Disadvantaged – was launched.

=== 2011–present ===
In 2011, the SAVH was featured in the Charity Governance Report 2011 of the Charity Council for good governance practices. Blind Singaporeans were, for the first time, able to vote independently and secretly in national elections. The SAVH celebrated its 60th anniversary with a publication entitled 'Beyond Braille'.

In 2012, the SAVH was voted as the most Supportive VWO for the Citi-YMCA Youth for Causes 2012 Programme. Mr Phillip Lee, Mr Tan Guan Heng and Mr Michael Tan were recruited by NCSS to be the 'Champions' in promoting the United Nations Convention on the Rights of Persons with Disabilities (UNCRPD) signed by Singapore on 30 November 2012. Singapore President Dr Tony Tan Keng Yam visited the SAVH on 11 March 2013 and graced the SAVH Charity Banquet on 26 March 2013. A Home Care Programme was launched. A Charity Concert for the SAVH was organised by Mr Qin Huai on 23 June 2013; Dr Lam Pin Min, MP for SengKang West, graced the event.

In 2014, the SAVH was selected for the 'Care and Share' Programme. A Charity Run was organised by The Institute of Singapore Chartered Accountants on 29 March 2014 for the SAVH; Mdm Halimah Yacob, Speaker of Parliament, graced the event. A Charity Dinner event for the SAVH was organised by ClearVision Eye Clinic, Vinci Arts, Lawry's The Prime Rib and Dr Tony Ho; Mr Chan Chun Sing, Minister of Social and Family Development graced the event. In 2015, "Rainbow In The Dark" art exhibition was held from 15 to 19 January 2015 at SCAPE; Mr Hri Kumar Nair, MP for Bishan-Toa Payoh GRC, graced the event. A Charity Banquet was organised in conjunction with SAVH's 63rd Anniversary on 17 March 2015; Mr Tharman Shanmugaratnam, Deputy Prime Minister and Ministry of Finance graced the event. A Day Care Centre pilot project was initiated.

In 2016, a Charity Concert was organised Mr Qin Huai and his volunteers on 16 January 2016 for the SAVH; Dr Lam Pin Min, Minister of State, Ministry of Health, graced the event. A Day Care Centre was established in August for its elderly clients. International White Cane Day was co-organised with Perennial Real Estate Holdings on 15 October 2016 at CHIJMES. Mr Tan Chuan-Jin, Minister of Ministry of Social and Family Development was the Guest-of-Honour.

In 2017, the SAVH upgraded its Orientation and Mobility (O&M) training to align with international standards with staff trained by an experienced O&M expert from the UK. Appreciation Night was organised on 24 March 2017 for donors and volunteers. Mr Chee Hong Tat, Senior Minister of State, Ministry of Communications and Information and Ministry of Health were the Guest-of-Honour.

== About ==
SAVH includes both visually handicapped and sighted members. SAVH's mission is to "help the visually handicapped help themselves by acquiring new skills and gaining self-reliance to cope with the integration into society."

Singaporeans that want to become a member of SAVH can be sighted or visually handicapped, they must be proposed and seconded by members. To join SAVH, applicants have to complete a membership form and must choose from 1 of 4 options to sign up: One-time payment of S$150 to become a Life Member, S$5 a year to become an Ordinary Member (visually handicapped), S$15 a year to become an Ordinary Member (sighted), and S$2 a year to become a Junior Member.

As of 2023 January 15, SAVH serves 4,387 registered clients.

== See also ==
- List of disability organisations in Singapore
- List of voluntary welfare organisations in Singapore
