= Peng Tsu Ying =

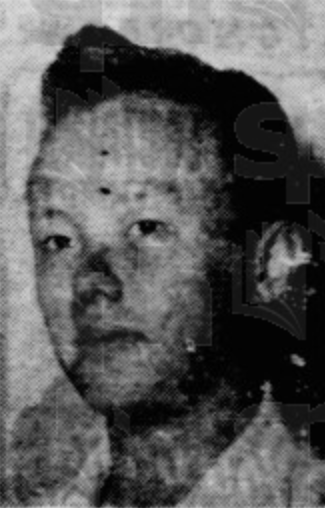
- Peng in 1949
- Born: Shanghai, China
- Died: 24 October 2018; Singapore
- Occupation: Educator

Peng Tsu Ying (died 24 October 2018) was a pioneer deaf educator in Singapore. Peng died of heart failure due to old age on 24 October 2018, aged 92.
