= Singapore National Para Games =

Multi-sports event for the disabled in Singapore

The Singapore National Para Games (SNPG), formerly known as National Disability Games and then as National Disability League (NDL), is a multi-sports event for the disabled in Singapore. The league is held over a period of a few months yearly, to promote sports and nurture healthy lifestyle amongst the disabled as well as providing local competitiveness opportunities. It serves as a platform for people with disabilities to participate in the event on both a recreational and competitive level, as well as to create better awareness of disability sports amongst the able-bodied community.

In 2002, the National Disability Games was a series of disability sports events spread over seven days. In 2006. the Singapore Disability Sports Council (SDSC) revamped the Games and renamed it as the National Disability League. This new league format allowed participants to compete across three months, increasing their opportunities for exposure and social interaction.

Between the years of 2002 and 2005, the spirit of the games has grown tremendously as the National Disability Games functioned as a series of disability sports events spread over seven challenging and competitive days. This strongly signifies the increasing number of disabled people who are keen to participate in sports-related activities and it confirms the proven popularity of this league structure.

In 2006, SDSC has transformed the National Disability Games into the very first National Disability League (NDL), spreading across two to three months of highly anticipated competitive sports experience and exposure. NDL had provided a sustainable platform to enhance the performance growth and 'feel' of competition during the three months. By inducting a sustainable platform, it allowed athletes to review areas of improvement in their performances and strive to improve during their next round of competition.

NDL 2009 saw the highest participation rate ever with 875 participants. These were a diverse mix of various disability groups from 12 voluntary welfare organisations, 6 special schools and 39 individuals. This was a remarkable achievement as compared to the previous years:

- 2008 - 687 participants (with 7 sports)
- 2007 - 518 participants (with 11 sports)
- 2006 - 357 participants (with 13 sports)

The 15 sports offered in 2009 were archery, badminton, basketball, boccia, bowling, chess, equestrianism, futsal, handcycling, lawn bowls, powerchair football, sailing, shooting, table tennis, and wheelchair basketball.

Besides its emphasis on sustainable sports development, NDL focuses on spotting sports talents as well and serves as an avenue to select athletes to represent Singapore at International and regional competitions such as the 1st Asian Youth Paralympic Games 2009 in Tokyo, Japan and the 5th ASEAN ParaGames 2009 Kuala Lumpur, Malaysia.

In 2016, the NDL was renamed the Singapore National Para Games to align with the Singapore National Games.
