= Girls' Brigade Singapore =

- Abbreviation: GB
- Formation: 1927; 99 years ago
- Founder: Mrs Elsie Lyne
- Type: Non-profit organisation
- Registration no.: S61SS0001A
- Legal status: Active
- Purpose: "To develop each Girl and Officer to her fullest potential by Equipping, Empowering and Enabling every Girl to be a leader, and every Officer a servant leader."
- Headquarters: Singapore
- Location: Singapore
- Official language: English
- Website: gb.org.sg

The Girls' Brigade Singapore is a youth uniformed group and part of the global Girls' Brigade movement which has been present in Singapore since 1927.
