= Singapore School for the Deaf =

School (1963–2017)

Coordinates: 1.3079°N 103.8777°E

Singapore School for the Deaf (SSD) was a school for deaf children in Singapore. It was operated by the Singapore Association for the Deaf (SADeaf).

It opened in 1963.

In January 1977, Dr. Jerry Goh Ewe Hong established the Philosophy of Total Communication or TC at the school.

From the 1980s to the early 1990s, its enrollment was about 300. By the 2010s, the number of students was below 20, and the school in 2011 froze enrolment, resulting in only 2 students remaining in the school as of 2017. That year, the school closed and sent its students to Lighthouse School.
