= Autism Resource Centre =

Non-profit organization in Singapore

ARC logo

Autism Resource Centre (Singapore) or ARC(S) is a Singapore-based non-profit organisation established in 2000. It was established by professional and parent volunteers dedicated to serving children and adults with Autism Spectrum Disorder (ASD) to help them lead meaningful and independent lives.

== Programmes ==
ARC(S) runs the following programs:

- WeCAN Early Intervention Programme (WeCAN EIP) - This provides direct intervention to children with autism who are 6 years old or younger using an internally developed autism curriculum. WeCAN EIP is the first internationally accredited early intervention programme in Asia by the National Autistic Society, United Kingdom. It currently serves 102 young children.
- Pathlight School - This is the first autism-focused school in Singapore offering mainstream academic curriculum, together with life readiness skills. The school caters to 7 to 18 years old students with ASD and related disorders who are cognitively able to access mainstream academic curriculum but require additional support in the form of smaller class sizes, special accommodations and teaching staff trained in autism. Pathlight presently has more than 1000 students enrolled in 3 educational programmes: Primary School, Secondary School, and Vocational Track.
- Autism Intervention, Training and Consultancy Unit (AITC) - This program offers training endorsed by Singapore's government and social service agencies to empower teachers, school leaders, professionals and family caregivers who support individuals affected by ASD. AITC also provides direct intervention services for individuals with ASD in education and workplaces.
- Employability and Employment Centre (E2C) - Launched on 19 March 2012, E2C serves the needs of teenagers and young adults with autism by providing a stable and predictable environment where adults with autism can be trained in employability and vocational skills to become productive members of the workforce. It has served more than 130 adult clients with autism and trained close to 50 adults now in various job placements.

== Collaborations ==
In 2005, ARC's Pathlight School partnered with Starbucks and set up a cafe training facility for youth with autism to provide them with skills. In 2014, Starbucks opened its 100th store in Singapore at The Fullerton Waterboat House, with six employees hired from ARC.

== See also ==
- List of autism organizations
