= The Helping Hand (halfway house) =

Halfway house in Singapore

- Type: Private
- Industry: Rehabilitation
- Founded: 1987; 39 years ago
- Headquarters: Singapore
- Key people: Robert Yeo

The Helping Hand (THH) is a halfway house in Singapore, registered as a Singapore non-governmental organization. The organization's objective is to "transform lives of ex-offenders through the love of Jesus Christ into restored and hardworking individuals, re-integrating them back into society as stable and contributing citizens".

== History and working model ==
The Helping Hand was founded in 1987 by Robert Yeo, a heroin addict. It is registered as a Voluntary Welfare Organization under the Singapore Ministry of Community Development, Youth and Sports with an Institution of Public Character Status.

The organization aims to rehabilitate drug offenders through its stated method of four types of therapy - Spiritual, Work, Social and Physical. Drug offenders in therapy (called the residents) typically undergo 3–6 months of treatment, during which they receive individual and group counselling. Residents stay at The Helping Hand's facility in Serangoon throughout their therapy.

== Funding ==
The Helping Hand receives operational cash primarily from sales from the furniture business that it operates. They are priced at 10 percent to 20 percent lower than the market rate. It can thus be defined as a social enterprise. Its premises at Serangoon serves as a warehouse where it showcases hundreds of Indonesian made teak furniture to the public. The Helping Hand also gets income from its moving services. They hire residents as workers for both services.

It was reported in 2011 that even though more and more people are engaging its services, The Helping Hand still faces stigma from its businesses as most of its workers are ex-addicts.

== Side ventures ==
The Helping Hand also engages in many side ventures started by residents. These services include computer repairs and gardening services. The main aim of these ventures is to help former offenders instead of generating profits. These ventures are usually started when residents indicate interest in a certain business they wish to explore.
