= Singapore Red Cross Society =

Humanitarian aid organization in Singapore

Coordinates: 1.2973°N 103.8445°E

- Persatuan Palang Merah Singapura (Malay) 新加坡红十字会 (Chinese) சிங்கப்பூர் செஞ்சிலுவை சங்கம் (Tamil)
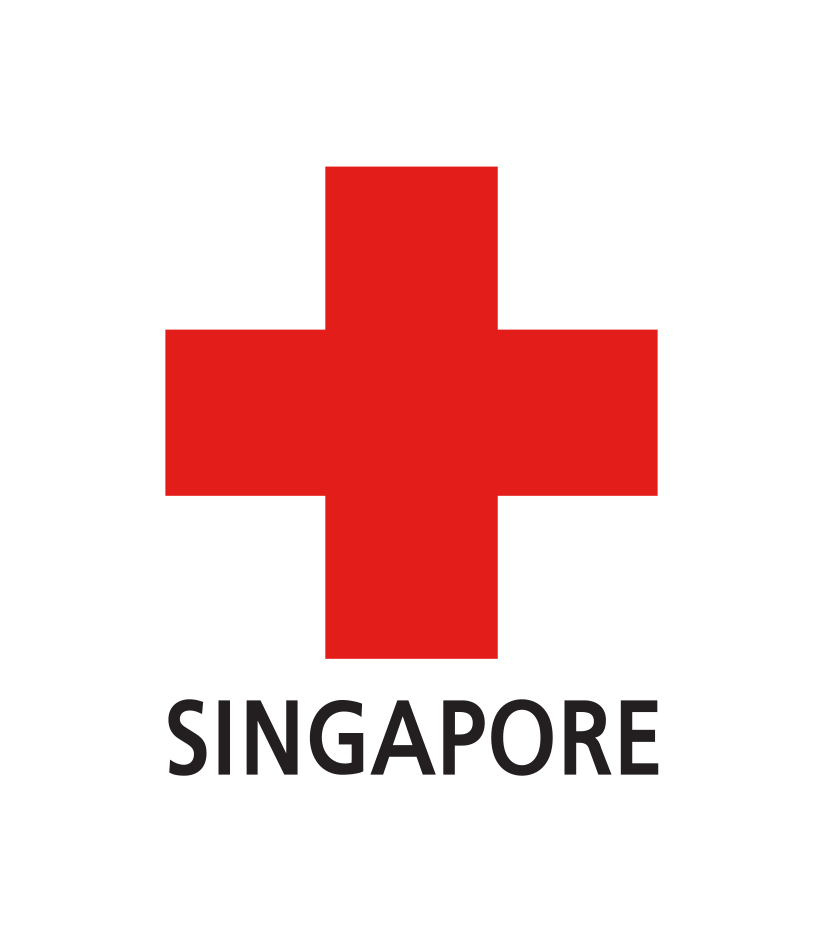
- Founded: 30 September 1949; 77 years ago
- Registration no.: S86CC0370E
- Legal status: Incorporated by the Parliament of Singapore on 6 April 1973
- Purpose: Humanitarian aid
- Headquarters: Red Cross House, 15 Penang Lane, Singapore 238486
- Location: Singapore, Singapore
- Region served: Singapore
- Patron: Tharman Shanmugaratnam, President of Singapore
- Chairperson: Tan Kai Hoe
- Vice Chairperson: Tan Poh Hong
- Secretary General: Benjamin William
- Secessions: British Red Cross Society
- Affiliations: International Federation of Red Cross and Red Crescent Societies; International Committee of the Red Cross; International Red Cross and Red Crescent Movement
- Website: www.redcross.sg
- Formerly called: Singapore Branch of the British Red Cross

The Singapore Red Cross (SRC; Malay: Persatuan Palang Merah Singapura, Chinese: 新加坡红十字会; pinyin: Xīnjiāpō hóng shízì huì, Tamil: சிங்கப்பூர் செஞ்சிலுவை சங்கம், romanized: Ciṅkappūr ceñciluvai caṅkam), formally the Singapore Red Cross Society, is a humanitarian aid and community services charity in Singapore. The SRC is a national member of the International Federation of Red Cross and Red Crescent Societies (IFRC) and International Committee of the Red Cross (ICRC) and forms a part of the International Red Cross and Red Crescent Movement.

The SRC provides a range of services and programmes including international aid across the Asia-Pacific region, international humanitarian law advocacy, emergency management, blood donation and community services for the youth, families, the elderly, and persons with disabilities.

The organisation traces its history back to when it was established on 30 September 1949 as part of the British Red Cross Society as the Singapore Branch of the British Red Cross. It was officially incorporated by the Parliament of Singapore on 6 April 1973 and was appointed as the National Blood Donor Recruiter by the Health Sciences Authority (HSA) in 2001.

== Organisation ==
The SRC is governed by a 19-member Council headed by a Chairman who is appointed by the President of the Republic of Singapore, the Patron of the SRC. The Council is responsible for pursuing the objective of the SRC as laid down by the Act of Parliament and its Constitution. The Council has four oversight committees providing the relevant advice and expertise; namely the Finance and Investment, Audit, Corporate Governance and Nomination and Human Resource and Compensation Committees.

The general management of the SRC is overseen by the Management Committee, headed by the Secretary General / Chief Executive Officer (CEO) of the SRC. Implementation of the policies and directives laid down by the Council is done by the Secretariat which is headed by the Secretary General / CEO. Since 2012, Benjamin William has served as the Secretary General of the Singapore Red Cross.

The Secretariat is organised into three divisions; Operations, Administration and the Red Cross Youth.

== Structure ==
The following are the incumbent appointment holders of the Singapore Red Cross:

Appointment	Incumbent
Patron	President of Singapore
Chairman	Tan Kai Hoe

== Divisions ==
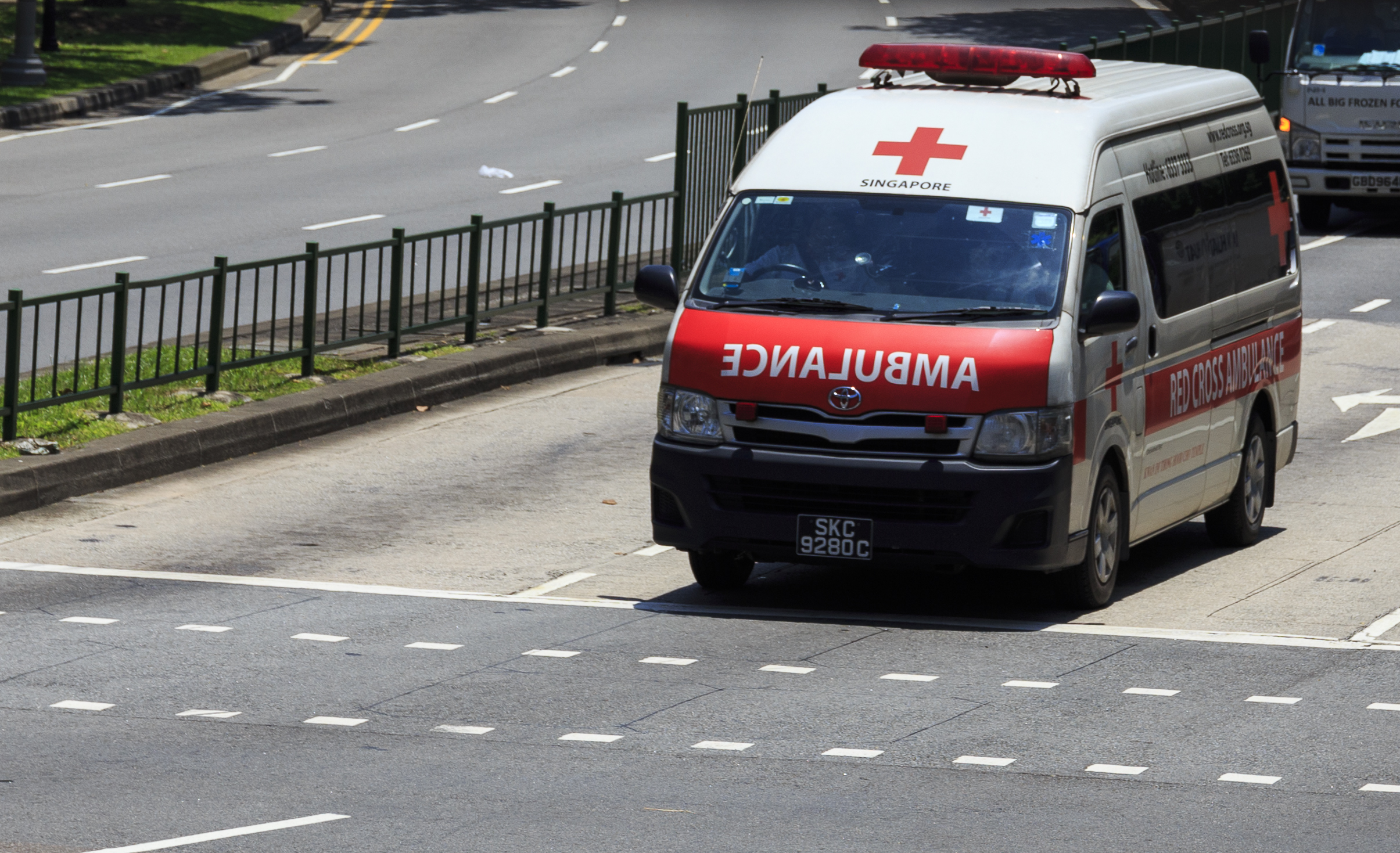
An ambulance of the Singapore Red Cross

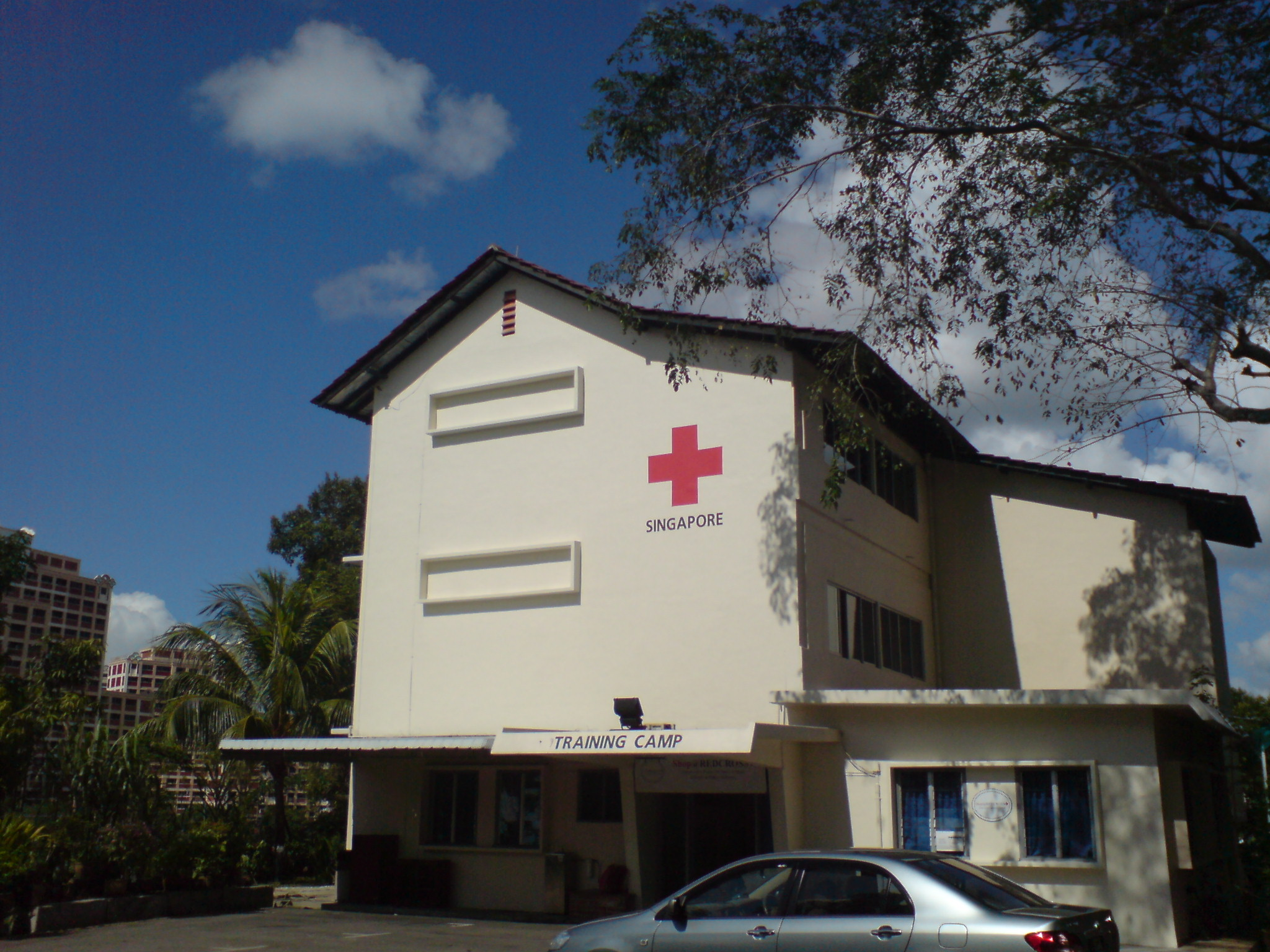
A campsite of the Singapore Red Cross

Learning & Development

- Singapore Red Cross Academy (formerly known as Red Cross Training Centre)
- Singapore Red Cross Youth

Blood Donor Programme

- Operations & Admin
- Marketing & Partnerships
- Youth

Global Engagement

- International Services
- Centre of Excellence in Pandemic Preparedness (CoEPP)
- Humanitarian Engagement

Community Engagement

- Community Services
- Community First Aid (formerly known as Community Resilience)
- Volunteer Management

Care Services

- Red Cross Home for the Disabled
- Day Activities Centre

Outreach

- Marketing & Communications (formerly known as Corporate Communications and Marketing & Partnerships)
- Resource Development (formerly known as Fund Raising)

Corporate Management

- Human Resources
- IT
- Admin (FM & OM)
- Compliance

Finance Management

- Finance
- Central Purchasing Unit
- Risk Management

== Work ==
The Singapore Red Cross was involved in the relief effort of the 2004 Indian Ocean earthquake and tsunami that occurred on 26 December 2004.

On 26 July 2018, SRC announced S$50,000 in humanitarian aid for victims of the Attapeu dam collapse.

In April 2022, Singapore Red Cross issued warning declaring Sri Lanka's medical crisis as an "unprecedented humanitarian crisis". The Government of Singapore announced that it would provide seed money amounting to USD 100,000 as a relief package to support the Singapore Red Cross's humanitarian public fundraising efforts for the most vulnerable communities in Sri Lanka.
