= Children's Cancer Foundation =

Australian charity

- Founded: 1 January 1992
- Type: Non-profit organization
- Registration no.: ABN 96 114 942 415
- Purpose: Paediatric cancer research, clinical care and family support
- Location: Melbourne, Australia
- Region served: Australia
- Revenue: $5.3 million (2024)
- Expenses: $1.0 million (2024)
- Volunteers: 20
- Website: childrenscancerfoundation.com.au

The Children's Cancer Foundation is a registered Australian charity that supports children with cancer and their families.

Established in 1992, the Foundation primarily funds childhood cancer research and clinical trials, as well as clinical care and family support programs.

Funds raised benefit The Royal Children's Hospital, Monash Children's Hospital, Hudson Institute of Medical Research, Monash University, Murdoch Children's Research Institute, Sydney Children's Hospital, University of New South Wales and the Australian and New Zealand Children's Haematology/Oncology Group (ANZCHOG).

== History and Structure ==
In 1992, parents of children undergoing treatment at Monash Children's Hospital established KOALA (Kids Oncology and Leukaemia Action) Group. In 2004, the KOALA Group was renamed as the KOALA Foundation and registered as a charity and as a company limited by guarantee. Tony McGinn OAM joined KOALA Group in 2002, was elected President of KOALA Group in 2003 and Chairman of KOALA Foundation on 24 June 2005.

In 1998, parents of children undergoing treatment at The Royal Children's Hospital established the Children's Cancer Centre Foundation. Jeremy Smith, Barrister with the Victorian Bar, joined the board of the Children's Cancer Centre Foundation on 29 March 2009 and was elected Chairman later that year.

In June 2012, the two charities merged to form the Children's Cancer Foundation.

The Children's Cancer Foundation and its sister charity My Room led a capital campaign from 2002–06, raising $23,055,434 to fund construction of a new Children's Cancer Centre at The Royal Children's Hospital and integrated research laboratories at Murdoch Children's Research Institute. The campaign was initiated in 2002 with the support of high profile and influential business leaders; construction commenced in November 2004; and the new facilities were opened on 10 October 2006. The Federal Government provided $10 million (plus interest of $392,000), the Victorian State Government provided $7.3 million and the Children's Cancer Foundation provided additional funding of $5,363,434, which included community, corporate and philanthropic contributions. The Children's Cancer Centre Laboratory continues today hosting several groups funded by the Foundation researching molecular diagnostics, childhood brain cancers, solid tumours and leukaemias.

The Foundation's board of directors, composed of prominent and influential business people, are all volunteers, many of who have been impacted by childhood cancer.

The Scientific Advisory Committee assesses all grant applications and advises the Foundation directors on which funding applications will have the highest impact in cancer prevention, diagnosis and/or treatment, family support and clinical care. The Scientific Advisory Committee and external reviewers are also volunteers.

== Funding ==
The Children's Cancer Foundation awards grants of $2 to $3 million each year and has distributed more than $52 million to date across clinical care, clinical trials, clinical research and family support.

In 2017, the Foundation expanded project funding to support national projects, including two clinical trials providing access to new treatments to children with cancer across Australia.

A new research initiative launched in 2017, the Hudson-Monash Paediatric Precision Medicine Program, aims to significantly improve treatment for children diagnosed with brain cancers and solid tumours. Scientists at the Hudson Institute of Medical Research have established a living biobank of paediatric brain tumours and solid cancers – including living organoids – to trial and develop targeted treatments and improve clinical outcomes, survival rates and quality of life for childhood cancer patients.

In 2019, the Children’s Cancer Foundation partnered with the University of Melbourne, the Victorian Comprehensive Cancer Centre, the Peter MacCallum Cancer Centre, the Royal Children’s Hospital and the Murdoch Children’s Research Institute to fund a new leadership position. The Endowed Chair is a new academic role focusing on clinical care development, paediatric cancer research and the academic development of future generations of paediatric cancer champions.

The Foundation currently has commitments of $15 million across over 30 projects from 2019 through to 2024, funding salaries for 40 hospital and research staff, laboratory consumables and family resources. The Foundation's financials are publicly available, more than $4 million in project funding since 2014 to support children with cancer and shows that over 78% of 2018–2019 of project funding related to clinical research.

=== Project Funding Pillars ===
1. Clinical Research
2. Clinical Trials
3. Clinical Care
4. Family Support

== Fundraising ==
The Million Dollar Lunch 2019, held on Friday, 9 August at the Palladium at Crown raised more than $2.1 million for the Foundation.

In addition to The Million Dollar Lunch, the Foundation raises funds through community fundraising, corporate partnerships, bequests and donations. The Foundation does not conduct public raffles or telemarketing and does not use third party fundraisers.
