= National Council of Social Service =

- Majlis Khidmat Sosial Kebangsaan (Malay) 国家福利理事会 (Chinese) தேசியச் சமூகச் சேவை மன்றம் (Tamil)

Agency overview
- Formed: 1 May 1992; 34 years ago
- Preceding agency: Singapore Council of Social Service
- Jurisdiction: Government of Singapore
- Headquarters: 170 Ghim Moh Road #01-02, Ulu Pandan Community Building, Singapore 279621
- Ministers responsible: Masagos Zulkifli, Minister for Social and Family Development; Desmond Lee, Minister-in-charge of Social Services Integration
- Deputy Ministers responsible: Goh Pei Ming, Senior Minister of State for Social and Family Development; Eric Chua, Senior Parliamentary Secretary for Social and Family Development
- Agency executives: Gregory Vijayendran, Chairman; Lim Shung Yar, CEO
- Parent Ministry: Ministry of Social and Family Development
- Child agencies: Community Chest; Social Service Institute
- Website: www.ncss.gov.sg
- Agency ID: T08GB0034K

The National Council of Social Service (NCSS; Malay: Majlis Khidmat Sosial Kebangsaan, Chinese: 国家福利理事会, Tamil: தேசியச் சமூகச் சேவை மன்றம்) is a statutory board under the Ministry of Social and Family Development (MSF) of the Government of Singapore. It is responsible for developing and coordinating the country's social service sector.

The organisation began in 1946 as the Singapore Department of Social Welfare, and was later reorganised over the decades to become the NCSS in 1992 under the National Council of Social Service Act. The NCSS raises funds through the Community Chest and provides training via the Social Service Institute.

== History ==
=== Establishment ===
The NCSS traces its origins to the Singapore Department of Social Welfare, which was set up in June 1946 to deal with social problems after World War II. A Social Welfare Council, chaired by the head of the department, served as its advisory body. In December 1958, the council became the Singapore Council of Social Service (SCSS), on the initiative of Dr Woon Wah Siang, then Director of the Social Welfare Council.

Its early members included philanthropist Ee Peng Liang, who served as its president in 1964. In 1983, Ee founded the Community Chest as a division of the SCSS. He had first suggested a shared charity fund in 1969, where donations would be pooled and then given out to different organisations. The Community Chest went on to become Singapore's largest charity.

=== Since 1992 ===
On 1 May 1992, the National Council of Social Service Act came into force, replacing the earlier Singapore Council of Social Service Act. Consequently, the SCSS was reorganised as the National Council of Social Service, and it became both a statutory board and a membership body. Ee also retired as president of the NCSS and the Community Chest that year. In 2003, the Social Service Institute was set up to train workers in the social service sector. The government has fully funded the NCSS's core functions since 2022.

On 1 August 2026, an amended NCSS Act took effect, formalising the NCSS's role as the developer of the social service sector. This has allowed the NCSS to move beyond its role as a coordinator to be able to identify gaps in social services and fund critical ones. The amendments also replaced the previous three tier membership of full, associate and honorary members, with a single tier of sector membership, and abolished membership fees. Sector membership is limited to organisations whose main work is to provide, or directly support social services. At the end of 2025, before the amendment, the NCSS had 428 full members, 99 associate members, and no honorary members.

In addition, the amendments also replaced the 23 member board with a Council of between 15 and 27 members, who will be in charge of governing the NCSS. Council members will serve terms for up to three years, and at least half of the Council members will be nominated by sector members.

== Functions ==
In line with its stated mission to "develop a sustainable social service sector that improves quality of life", the NCSS works with various government ministries to identify service needs, coordinate services between providers, and direct resources to the most critical needs. It does so by building capability and capacity through organisational and professional development that promotes a focus on outcomes and good governance among Social Service Agencies (SSAs). SSAs, formerly known as Voluntary Welfare Organisations until 2019, are non-profit organisations that provides welfare or social service to vulnerable or disadvantaged groups in Singapore.

The NCSS also develops the wider social service ecosystem by rallying community support and encouraging long-term philanthropy and corporate volunteering. Several of the fundraising and volunteer projects the organisation have helped support include the SG Cares movement, SG Share, and the President's Challenge.

== Divisions ==
=== Community Chest ===
The Community Chest (ComChest) is the NCSS's fundraising arm, raising funds for more than 150 Social Service Agencies. As its operating costs are covered mainly by the Tote Board, all public donations go directly to the causes it supports. The SG Share, a regular giving programme under ComChest, was supported by about 260,000 individual donors and 2,500 companies. In 1984, the ComChest introduced its mascot, Sharity, a pink elephant created to teach children the values of caring and sharing.

=== Social Service Institute ===
The Social Service Institute (SSI) is the NCSS's training arm. It is responsible for developing the capabilities of the social service sector by training social service professionals and helping organisations improve their operations, with the aim of preparing the sector for future needs. In 2019, it launched the Skills Framework for Social Service, which sets out career paths and skills for people working or intending to work in the sector.

== See also ==
- List of social service agencies in Singapore
