= Edusave =

The Edusave (Chinese: 教育储蓄) programme is part of a scheme implemented for education in Singapore by the Ministry of Education (MOE) for Singapore. Its stated aim is to maximise opportunities for all Singaporean children. The scheme aims to reward students who perform well or who make good progress in their academic and non-academic work, and provides students and schools who qualify with funds to pay for enrichment programmes or to purchase additional resources. It is applicable to Singaporeans between the age of 6 and 16 and studying full-time at government, government-aided or independent schools, junior colleges (JC) and Centralised Institutes (CI), Institute of Technical Education (ITE) or special education schools.

The Edusave Endowment Fund is built from various contributions from the government of Singapore. The fund is invested into by the government and the interest earned is used to finance the contributions, grants and awards given to schools and students.

There are 3 main aspects of Edusave: the Edusave Pupils Fund, Edusave Grants and Edusave Scholarships and Awards.

== Edusave Pupils Fund ==
Singaporeans between the age of 6 and 16 at the point of school admission will automatically be given an Edusave account and receive a yearly contribution from the Government’s Edusave Pupils Fund until they reach 16. However, only the first, second and third child were eligible for the Edusave account prior to 2004. In 2005, the Government will contribute $170 and $200 to the Edusave account of each eligible student at primary and secondary level respectively.

From 2014, eligibility to receive Edusave contributions has been extended to all Singaporean children aged 7 to 16, including those not studying in MOE-funded schools, such as those enrolled in the madrasahs, privately funded schools, as well as children who are home-schooled or residing overseas.

In addition, the Edusave contributions and top-ups have been revised to $230 for primary-level students and $290 for secondary-level students.

For Singaporeans who are currently not enrolled in any MOE-funded school, the annual Edusave contribution rate will be pegged to that of a typical student in a MOE-funded school. Those aged 7 to 12 will receive the quantum applicable to primary level students, and those aged 13 to 16 will receive the quantum applicable to secondary level students. For those who are required to sit for the Primary School Leaving Examination (PSLE) as part of the conditions for exemption from the Compulsory Education Act, they will receive contributions at the primary-level rate until they fulfill their PSLE requirements. Students above the age of 16 who are still in secondary school will also receive the top-up.

== Edusave Grants ==
Government-supported special education schools and the Institute of Technical Education receive annual Edusave grants to be used to organize common enrichment programmes or purchase additional resources which benefit students.

== Edusave Scholarships and Awards ==
There are various reward programmes for students who meet certain academic rankings as well, some of which is targeted at low-income households.

The Edusave Scholarships (ES) include:

- Edusave Entrance Scholarships for Independent Schools
- Edusave (Independent Schools) Yearly Awards
- Edusave Scholarships for Integrated Programme Schools
- Edusave Scholarships for Primary Schools
- Edusave Scholarships for Secondary Schools

The Edusave Awards include:

- Edusave Merit Bursary
- Good Progress Award
- Edusave Awards for Achievement and Good Leadership and Service
- Edusave Character Awards
- Edusave Skills Award
- Achievement Awards for Special Education Students
