= Ministry of Education Language Centre =

Location
- Bishan Campus: 11 Bishan Street 14; Singapore 579782; Newton Campus: 136 Cairnhill Road; Singapore 229722; Singapore; 1.35343°N 103.85233°E (Bishan Campus), 1.30972°N 103.83743°E (Newton Campus)

Information
- Language: English
- Website: www.moelc.moe.edu.sg

The Ministry of Education Language Centre (MOELC) is a centralised educational institution for students in Singapore's education system to learn additional languages. There are two campuses located in Bishan and Newton, which are managed by the Ministry of Education of Singapore. Students attend the institution on top of the existing school they are attending.

Its primary purpose is to offer foreign language courses to students that will generally be their third language, within an official grading scheme reported back to their schools. However, it also teaches the Malay language as an institute where Malay can be learned as some schools do not have a Malay Department. In exemption cases, students can replace learning their mother tongue with a foreign language offered by the MOELC, as a second language is a requirement for all students in the Singapore education system.

Exemption is typically invoked if the student in question is returning from abroad and is not proficient in his or her mother tongue, or is an expatriate whose mother tongue is not one of the three "official" ethnic language groups of Singapore – namely the Malay language, the Chinese language or the Indian languages.

== Courses ==
The Bishan MOELC offers the French, Arabic, German and Japanese languages while the Newton MOELC offers the French, Spanish and Japanese languages under the Foreign Language Programme. The Malay language is not included in both as it is generally considered a mother tongue. The Malay language courses have both a Malay (Special Programme) and a Higher Malay track for different degrees of advancement in the language. Students of Higher Malay language are able to cede two points off their O-level score (a lower number is considered better in total O-level scoring) as long as some other minimal requirements are fulfilled.

The main focus of the MOELC is at the secondary education level. Grading is examination-oriented. The formal goal of the MOELC is to have the students pass their GCE 'O' Levels for their respective languages, as the MOELC does not issue a diploma per se upon students' graduation from their respective courses. Qualifications received thus take in the form of an O-level certificate. For students taking a foreign language as their second language, these second language qualifications are necessary to enter most tertiary institutions in Singapore, due to the requirement for bilingualism. Grades are reported quarterly to the students' respective schools, with the two Continual Assessments (each making up 15% of the year-end grade), the first Semestral Assessment (25%) and the Final Examination (45%) contributing to a student's final grade. In some schools which offer the Integrated Programme, students are also allowed to replace their lowest scoring subject's results with their Third Language's results if it is higher than that of their lowest scoring subject, provided the subject being replaced is not one of the Promotion Criteria subjects (subjects that students have to pass in order to proceed to the next level of education, e.g. English).

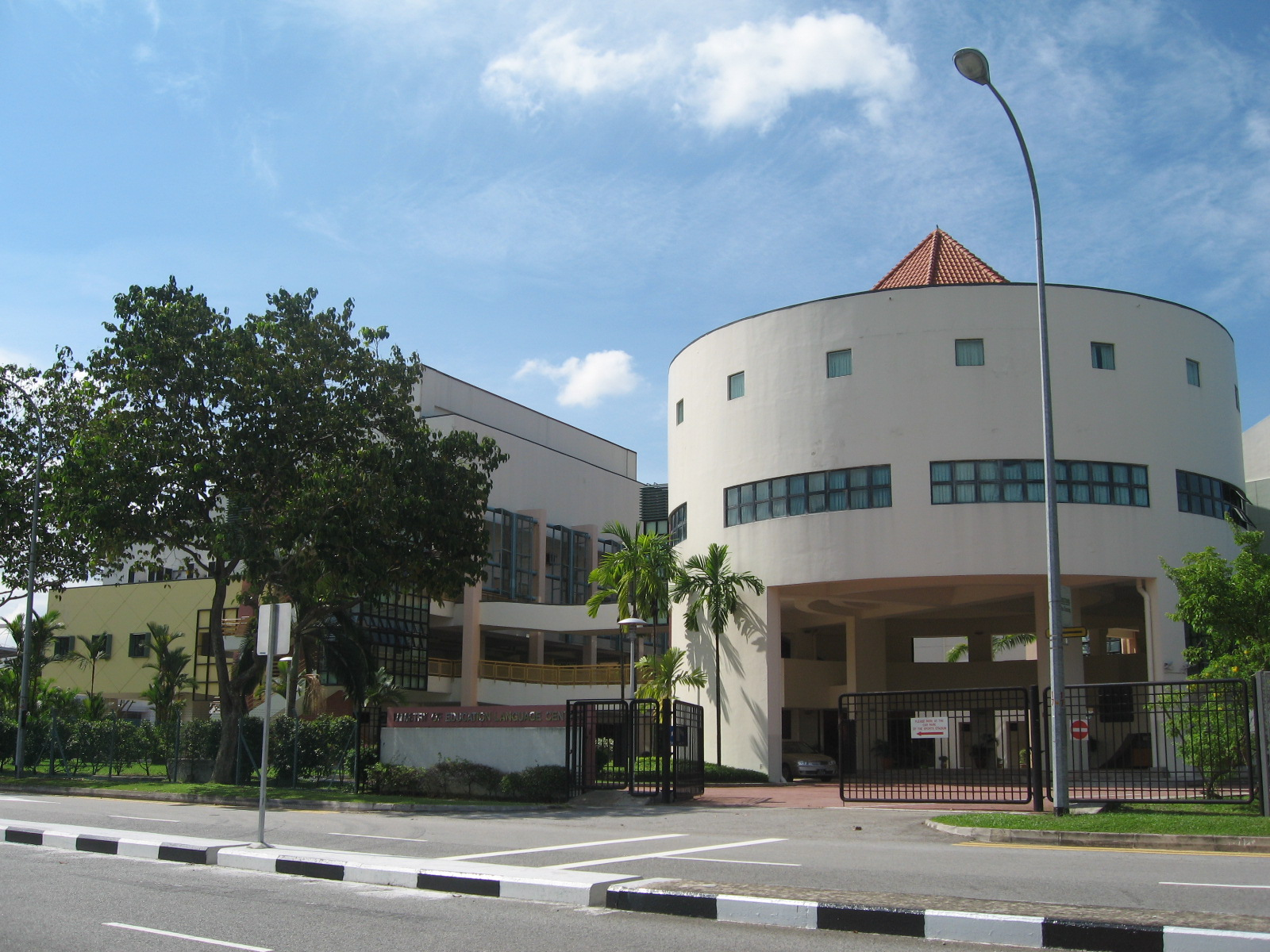
One of the campuses of The Ministry of Education Language Centre is located at Bishan Street 14, which was opened in 1998.

The other main purpose of the centre is language enrichment and provision of grades back to the students' respective schools. This is because as the students progress through secondary school and junior college, the workload of their other subjects causes many students to drop their third language course at MOELC. The years that have been taken go on record and these can be used as partial qualifications later on in life.

Depending on the language taken, students may also take several other foreign language examinations, such as the French DELF/DALF certification examinations and the Japanese Language Proficiency Test. The focus on the additional examinations picks up for Junior College students, who take at least the GCE 'A' Levels at the conclusion of their course. This is primarily for students who eventually intend to receive tertiary education overseas; the language medium of their courses will be their third language (a national or official language of the destination country).

Generally, Indian students whose mother tongues are neither Tamil nor among the languages offered by their schools do not apply to the MOELC to take an Indian language. As the MOELC does not offer these, such students will have to find an alternative centre instead (see the list of schools in Singapore).

Since 2008, Indonesian and Arabic have been offered as part of the Asian Languages programme, bringing the number of Third Languages offered by MOE from the original 5 to 7. The aim of the two new Third Languages is to facilitate future Singaporean engagement with Indonesia and to open up bridges into the Middle East, the latter being one of the world's fast-growing regions.

In 2014, Spanish was introduced as a third language offered to Secondary 1 students, and is currently also offered to first-year Junior College students.

=== Exchange programmes ===
Every year, there are opportunities for students to participate in immersion programmes to countries where the language is spoken natively, to better learn and appreciate the language.

== History ==
The Bishan Language Centre opened in 1996. Previously, there was only one Language Centre, at Winstedt Road. Formerly, there were eight decentralised regional institutions that taught extra languages, with the decentralisation akin to that of the Institute of Technical Education (ITE). The Ministry of Education decided to combine all the faculty and resources into one centralised building for greater efficiency in teaching students. The side effect of such centralisation is that there may be long travel times from some parts of the country on Singaporean public transport, although the travelling time for one trip does not usually exceed more than fifty minutes. The building was recently renovated.

== Admission and student cohort ==
=== Fees ===
The MOELC does not charge tuition fees, but students must buy their own materials and textbooks. This cost varies among the languages taken. For instance, the cost of materials for the French course for the first year ranges around S$90–100. After the first year, however, most of the materials are reused, including dictionaries.

=== Entry requirements ===
Entry requirements are mainly academics-based. In general, a student must have scored 8 or less in the Primary School Leaving Examination (PSLE) to be considered for entry into the French, Spanish, German and Japanese courses, and scored 24 or less to enter into the Malay courses. These requirements can be lowered for second language exemption cases.

Thus, the bulk of the students are usually from elite secondary schools whose intake cohorts have a high mean PSLE score. However, a significant portion of the population comes from the junior colleges, as well as students from secondary schools whose cohorts' mean PSLE scores are not as high as those of the elite secondary schools. There are no primary school students.

Officially, if a student is not a citizen or permanent resident in Singapore, he or she can only take Malay courses, although exceptions are common.

=== Entry requirements for Japanese and Higher Malay ===
As a strong grasp of logograms is needed to study the Japanese language (whose writing system includes kanji, or modified Chinese characters), only students who have previously taken the Chinese language as a PSLE subject are allowed to take the Japanese language course, with exceptions.

Higher Malay is a continuation of previous Malay knowledge from primary school, so only students who took Malay as a PSLE subject are eligible for Higher Malay. Non-Malay students, or students who did not take Malay as a PSLE subject, can take the Malay Special Programme.

=== Lesson times ===
Prior to 2009, classes at the MOELC took place in two sessions, one from 2.30 pm to 4.30 pm, and one from 4.30 pm to 6.30 pm. Examinations may take place either in the morning or the afternoon with variable timing. There are several hundred students per session on a particular day, and students attend two days a week, out of a possible five. This puts the total amount of admissions per year at several thousand.

With effect from 2009, Secondary One to Four students offering French, German and Japanese need only attend lessons at MOELC once a week. Each lesson lasts 3 hours 15 minutes, with a 15-minute break, in addition to a hypothetical 45 minutes of e-learning. Hence, similar to arrangements prior to 2009, 4 hours of instruction are administered weekly.

Students offering Malay (Special Programme), Arabic and Indonesian continued with the arrangements prior to 2009 until 7 February 2011. From 7 February 2011 onwards, these students will have lessons only once a week for 3 hours 15 minutes.

JC H1 and H2 students offering French, German and Japanese follow arrangements prior to 2009; they attend lessons twice a week, each lasting 2 hours.

The introduction of the hypothetical 45 minutes of weekly e-learning into the curricula of the Secondary One to Four students offering French, German and Japanese has led to the abolition of e-learning weeks, formerly held twice a year, from all other curricula, including those of the unaffected Arabic and Indonesian, as well as the JC H1 and H2 French, German and Japanese courses. The introduction of weekly e-learning has been through the use of an online e-learning portal. From 2018, the Student Learning Space has been the e-learning portal used. Prior to 2018, MConline was used. From April to June 2020, due to the COVID-19 outbreak, lessons were solely conducted online, on the Student Learning Space and video-conferencing software.

== Facilities ==
=== Bishan Campus ===
The MOELC (Bishan Campus) is located on Bishan Street 14 between the former ITE Bishan building and the Bishan Stadium. Located north of the Bishan Bus Interchange and the Junction 8 Shopping Centre, it is separated from them by Bishan Street 14 and a large field. Access to the Mass Rapid Transit (MRT) network occurs through Bishan MRT station.

The centre also has several IT labs, a multilingual library, and an auditorium that can be used for presentations, lectures and screenings of foreign language films. All classrooms have multimedia support.

=== Newton Campus ===
The MOELC (Newton Campus) is located on 136 Cairnhill Road. Access to the Mass Rapid Transit (MRT) network occurs through Newton MRT station.

== Discipline ==
Students attending classes at MOELC wear their school uniform. PE attire is not permitted.

Rules and regulations exist but, in general, MOELC itself does not mete out punishment. Students who commit significant offences, such as vandalism, fighting, smoking or defiance, are referred back to their own schools for disciplinary action.
