= TUM Asia =

University in Singapore

Technical University of Munich (TUM) Asia
- Established: 2002
- Affiliations: TUM
- Location: 61 Nanyang Drive, Academic Building North, ABN-B2a-08, 637335, Singapore, Singapore; 1°18′27″N 103°46′41″E
- Website: tum-asia.edu.sg

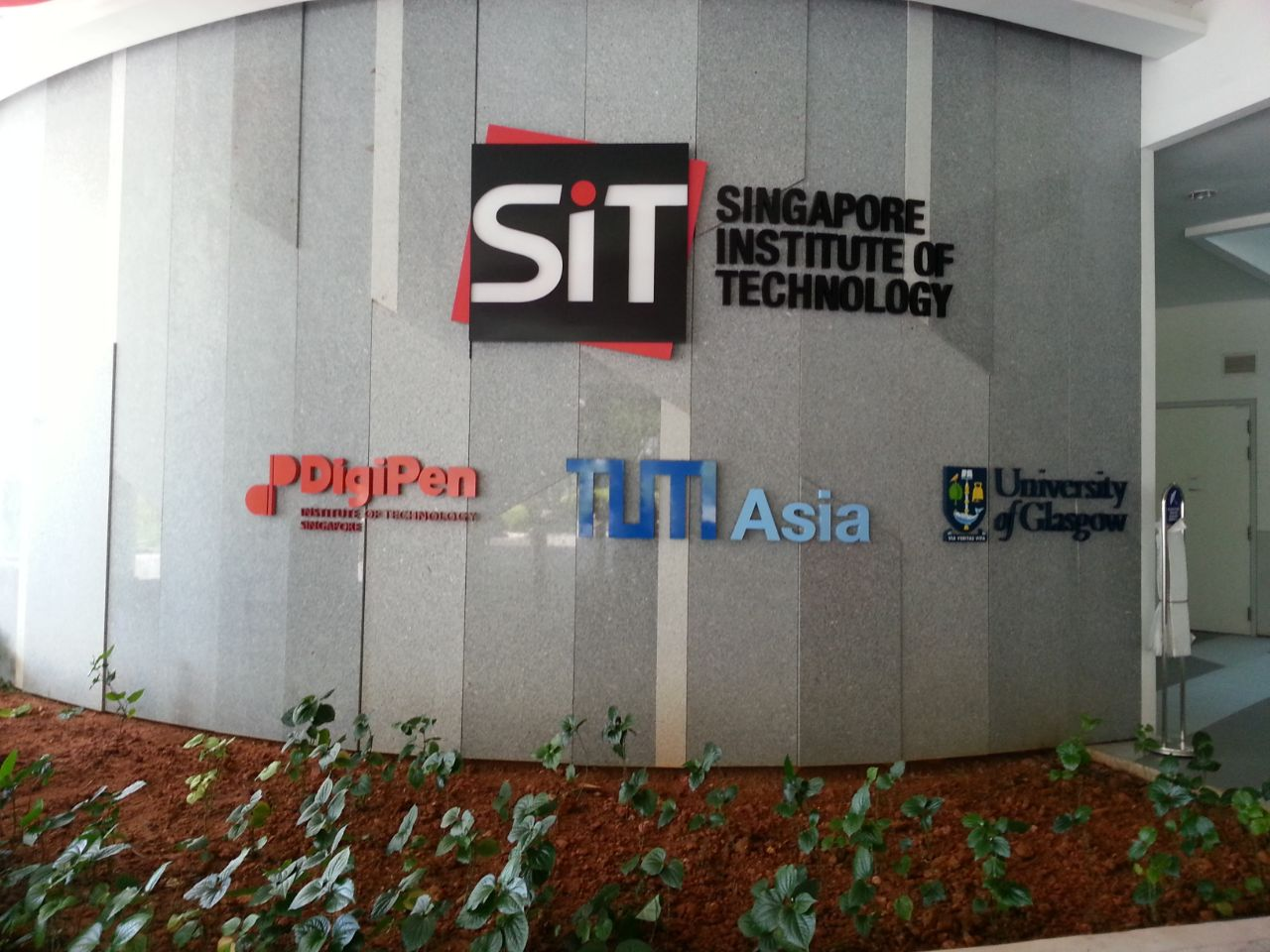
Entrance to the TUM Asia building

The German Institute of Science and Technology – TUM Asia is an institute for research and education located in Singapore, formed in 2002 as the Asian campus of the Technical University of Munich.

== Background ==
GIST-TUM Asia was set up in Singapore in 2002, under the Singapore government's Global Schoolhouse Initiative. GIST-TUM Asia currently offers 5 Master of Science programmes, MSc in Industrial Chemistry; MSc in Integrated Circuit Design; MSc in Green Electronics; MSc in Aerospace Engineering; and MSc in Transport and Logistics. The former three programmes are run jointly with either Nanyang Technological University (NTU) or National University of Singapore (NUS) and the latter two programmes are pure TUM programmes.

GIST-TUM Asia then partnered Singapore Institute of Technology (SIT) to offer Bachelor of Science programmes in Electrical Engineering and Information Technology and Chemical Engineering in 2010. Admitted students undergo a 2 ½ year programme that includes a 2 to 4 month overseas exchange at the Munich campus.

In 2020, TUM deepened their partnership with SIT and change the Electrical Engineering Program and Chemical Engineering Program into 4 years Bachelor of Engineering with Honours.

TUM CREATE, a research initiative by GIST-TUM Asia, was incepted in June 2010 to propagate research programmes where scientists and researchers from both Germany and Singapore can work together for the advancement of science and technology. With the research agreement in TUM CREATE Centre for Electromobility in Megacities sealed between GIST-TUM Asia and National Research Foundation of Singapore (NRF), the research programme will focus on developing innovative systems that incorporate safety and reliability with functionality and energy efficiency in electric vehicles.
