= Millennia Institute =

Coordinates: 1°21′2.6″N 103°44′26.5″E

- 励仁高级中学 (Chinese); Institut Millennia (Malay) மிலெனியா கல்வி நிலையம் (Tamil)

Location
- 60 Bukit Batok West Avenue 8 Singapore 658965

Information
- Type: Public; Government
- Established: 3 January 2004; 22 years ago
- School code: 0908
- Principal: Loo Ming Yaw
- Staff: 100
- Colours: Red; Blue
- Mission: Nurture Talents, Achieve Success
- Website: millenniainstitute.moe.edu.sg

Millennia Institute (MI) is a centralised institute in Singapore offering three-year pre-university education. It is currently the only pre-university centre to offer the Commerce stream apart from the traditional arts and science streams offered by pre-university institutions.

== History ==
=== Outram Institute (1987–2004) ===
Outram Institute was the first centralised institute to open in 1987 and was the oldest such institute before its merger into Millennia Institute. Outram Institute occupied the former premises of the Chung Hwa Girls' High School and led by her first school principal, Mrs Lim Han Soon.

In 1989, Outram Institute was the first pre-university centre in Singapore to offer the London Chamber of Commerce and Industry examination, on top of the Singapore-Cambridge GCE Advanced Level examination. The first batch of its students achieved an 80 percent pass rate in the London Chamber of Commerce and Industry examination, as reflected on a local article on 18 October 1989.

=== Jurong Institute (1989–2004) ===
Jurong Institute was the third centralised institute when it was established in 1989 and was initially located at Jurong West Street 91. The Institute moved to 2 Toh Tuck Terrace on 18 November 1994.

Jurong Institute was known for its stringent examination standards, which hit the news in 1990. The uproar involved the institute's policy that all advancing students of the promotional examination are required to re-take all subjects in the supplementary exam, including the ones cleared by the students in the promotional examination.

=== Merger as Millennia Institute ===
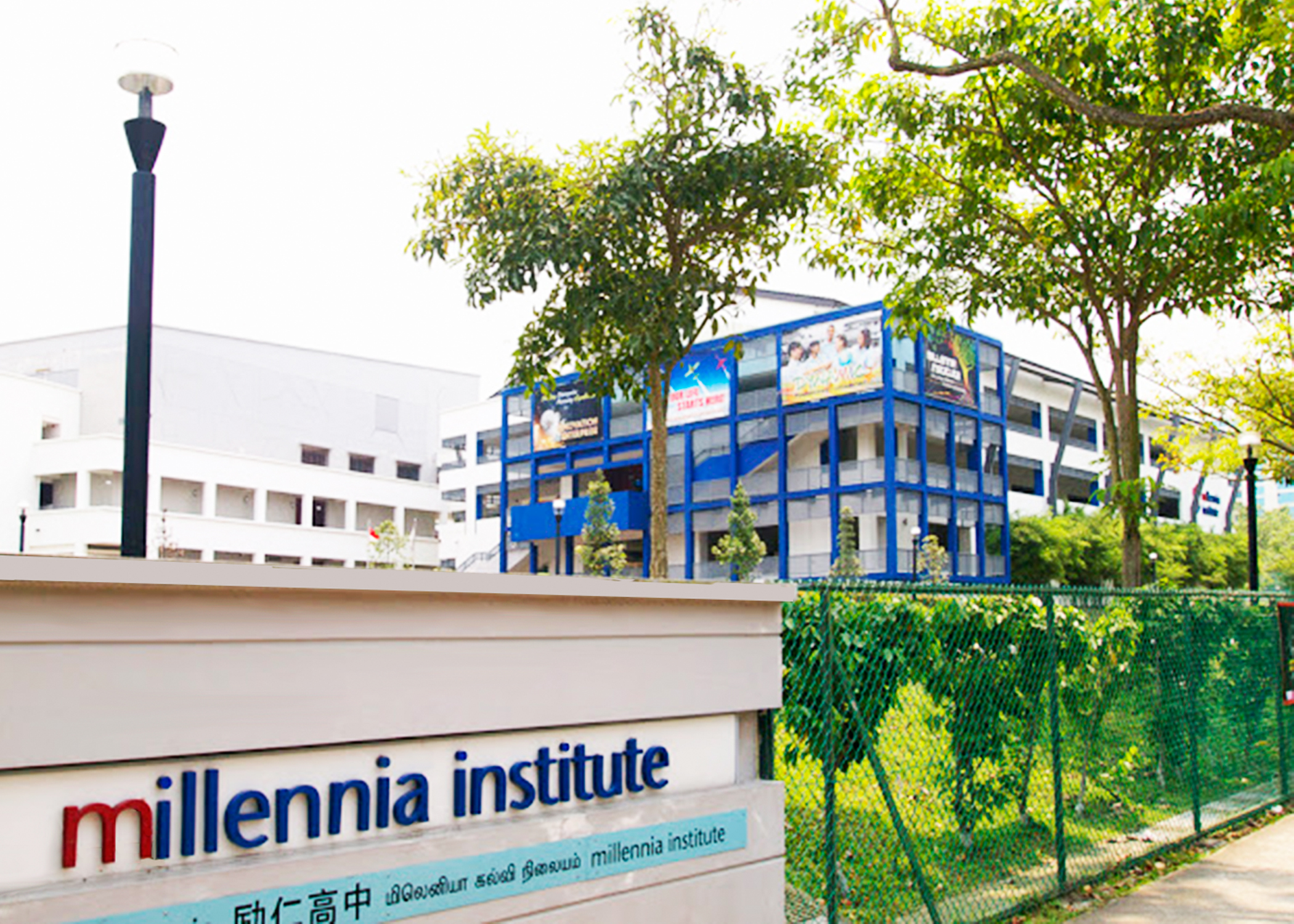
Millennia Institute campus at Bukit Batok, taken in 2007.

On 26 July 2003, decision was made public by the Ministry of Education on the merger of Outram Institute and Jurong Institute to conglomerate the sparsely organised three-year pre-university institutions into a single entity. This move was to allow consolidation of expertise and teaching resources of the two institutes, and provide students with more customised programmes and facilities, thereby enhancing the delivery of the three-year pre-university education programme. As a result, Millennia Institute was established on 3 January 2004. A new campus was announced on 2 December 2003 to be ready in 2007.

=== After relocation to new current campus ===
On 12 December 2006, the institution relocated to its permanent campus at 60 Bukit Batok West Avenue 8. The permanent campus was officially declared open in May 2009 by former Minister for Education Dr. Ng Eng Hen as the guest of honour.

In May 2012, the Millennia Institute chaired the annual pre-University seminar at Nanyang Technological University. Held in conjunction with the Ministry of Education, the event was the first to include a theme song since the inception of the seminar.

Between 2011 and 2021, the enrollment rate at Millennia Institute declined by more than 40%. As of May 2023, the total student population stood at 700.

== Principals ==
| Name of Principal | Years served |
|---|---|
| Ong-Ooi Giok Tin | 2004–2005 |
| Tan Chor Pang | 2006–2013 |
| Tan Wan Yu | 2014–2023 |
| Loo Ming Yaw | 2024–present |

== Admission ==
Millennia Institute accepts its students based on academic merit through the annual joint admission exercise, which allows non-integrated programme students to apply to post-secondary institutions via their Singapore-Cambridge GCE Ordinary Level examination results. The net aggregate L1R4 result, which encompasses the results of a first language and four relevant content-based subjects (of which mathematics and a humanities subject is mandatory), is considered for the admission to Millennia Institute.

== Campus ==
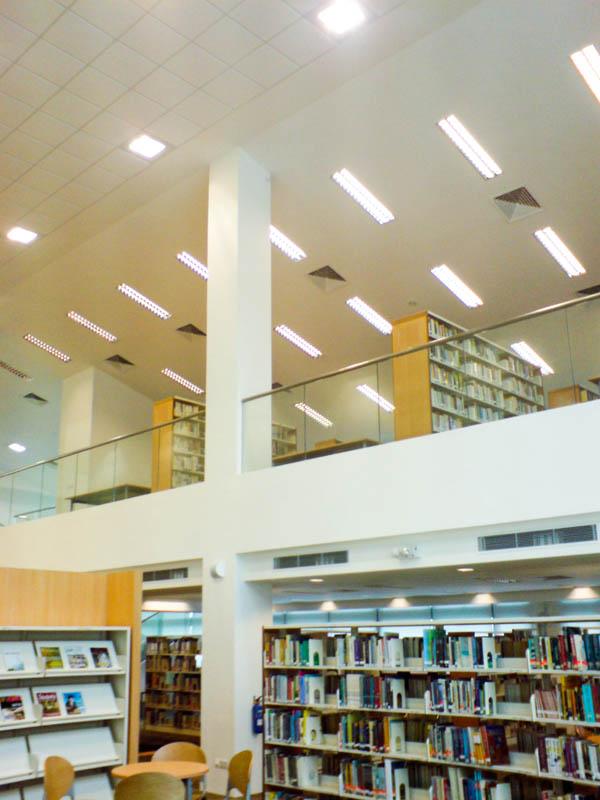
MIndSpace, the library of Millennia Institute.

Millennia Institute's campus along Bukit Batok West Avenue 8 covers an area of approximately 16 hectares. Constructed at a cost of around S$24 million, the purpose-built campus catering to pre-university education is completed with Junior College equivalent facilities, including two air-conditioned lecture theatres designed to accommodate the entire cohort.

Tutorial rooms are built into a single block, streamlined to connect the tutorial rooms conveniently to the lecture rooms, canteen and the laboratories. Other facilities include an auditorium, a fully air conditioned multi-purpose hall and a sports complex with running track, AstroTurf hockey pitch, as well as 2 tennis, 2 basketball, badminton and volleyball courts.

The library, stylised as "MIndSpace", is located at the heart of the campus. The MIndSpace feature five discussion rooms located at the upper level for small-group study, discussions or project work, as well as two instructional rooms that can accommodate 36 students each for teaching and learning.

== Academic information ==
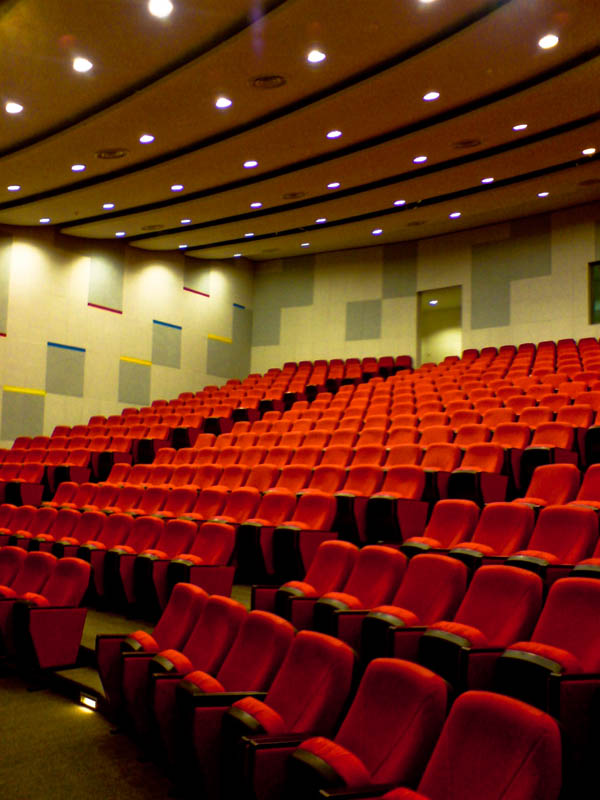
Auditorium in Millennia Institute, taken on 29 December 2006

The three-years course offered at Millennia Institute leads to the Singapore-Cambridge GCE Advanced Level examination. As opposed to two year courses offered at junior colleges, students at the Millennia Institute have an additional year to prepare for the national examinations, with Project Work and H1 level Mother Tongue Languages examined in the second year. Millennia Institute is the only public pre-university centre in Singapore to offer Commerce for the Singapore-Cambridge GCE Advanced Level examination, with Management of Business and Principles of Accounts offered the two Commerce stream academic subjects.

== Controversy ==
In January 2021, an 18-year-old transgender female student at Millennia Institute in Singapore alleged that the school barred her from attending classes due to its dress code policy. The student, known as Ashlee, stated that the school required her to cut her hair and wear the male uniform to be allowed in class. This incident gained attention on social media and involved support from LGBTQ organizations. The Ministry of Education (MOE) and the Institute of Mental Health (IMH) issued a joint statement affirming the school’s commitment to providing educational support, including home-based learning, while working with the student’s family and medical professionals. The statement also emphasized the importance of privacy and detailed the clinical process for treating gender dysphoria, noting that medical treatments require parental consent for minors.

== See also ==
- Education in Singapore
- List of schools in Singapore
- Former centralised institutions in Singapore
