= Centralised institutes (Singapore) =

Educational Institutions in Singapore

Centralised institutes in Singapore offer three-year pre-university courses under three streams, the traditional science and arts streams concurrently offered in junior colleges, and the commerce streams. These lead to the Singapore-Cambridge GCE Advanced Level examinations, and formerly in complement with the London Chamber of Commerce and Industry examinations.

Millennia Institute is now the only centralised institute in Singapore, established in 2004 through the merger of Outram and Jurong Institutes. Other former centralised institutes included Seletar Institute and Townsville Institute.

== History ==
=== Establishment of Institutes ===
The centralised institutes education pathway was first introduced in Singapore in the late 1980s with an education reform involving the pre-university education system. The establishment of centralised institutes as specialised centres for Commerce pre-university streams was in line with the creation of commerce and technical streams at junior colleges. Technical streams are reformed as diplomas in polytechnics.

==== Establishment of Outram Institute ====
Outram Institute (Chinese: 欧南高级中学) was one of four original centralised institutes in Singapore, and one of the two that was merged to establish the current only centralised institute, Millennia Institute. Outram Institute was the first centre in Singapore specialising in commercial studies. Students in Outram Institute take the A Levels in three years, unlike other pre-university course students in Junior Colleges.

In the 1980s, three-year pre-university courses were conducted in several secondary schools. In 1987 the Ministry of Education set up the first institute, Outram Institute, to offer three-year pre-university courses on a centralised basis. Outram Institute prepared students for the GCE 'A' Level Examinations. Initially, it concentrated on commerce subjects and had only the commerce stream. The arts stream was later introduced to the school. Outram Institute functioned on a full-day basis and teaching modes included lectures and classroom instruction. Admission is based on the aggregate point of first language and four relevant subjects. Mrs Lim Han Soon, Principal of Outram Secondary School, was appointed the first principal of Outram Institute.

The institute was temporarily accommodated in premises at Bartley Road which were vacated by Chung Hwa High School when that school moved to new premises in December 1987. The Bartley Road premises were then renovated to provide the necessary facilities.

In 1989, Outram Institute was the first pre-university centre in Singapore to offer the London Chamber of Commerce and Industry examination, on top of the Singapore-Cambridge GCE Advanced Level examination. The first batch of students achieved an 80 percent pass rate.

==== Establishment of Jurong Institute ====
Jurong Institute (Chinese: 裕廊高级中学) was formed in 1989 as Singapore's third centralised institute. The inaugural campus was located at Jurong West Street 91. In 1994 it relocated to 2 Toh Tuck Terrace.

==== Establishment of Seletar Institute ====
Seletar Institute (Chinese: 立德高级中学) was established in January 1988 as Singapore's second centralised institute. It began operations with 17 staff and 186 students in January 1989, at the former campus of Upper Thomson Secondary School at 14.5 km off Upper Thomson Road.

In 1990 the campus was expanded, with a new two-storey block at the back of the original facility, consisting of 10 classrooms at Level 1 and two lecture theatres at Level 2. The pioneer batch students (10 classes or what was known as "Civics Tutorial Group") moved to the new block while the two junior batches remained at the old block. Its library, third lecture theatre and four additional classrooms were built in 1991, its fourth lecture theatre, gymnasium, weight room, fitness stations, art studio and students' locker room in 1992, and its conference room, printing room, counselling room, resource rooms and staff lounges in 1993. Air-conditioners were installed throughout. It underwent repainting, renovation and upgrades in 1994, with a new volleyball court and walkway to Block B from the canteen and Internet introduced in 1995. In 1996, a computer corner was created for the benefit of students without internet access or computer.

==== Establishment of Townsville Institute ====
Townsville Institute (Chinese: 城景高级中学) was the fourth centralised institute established in Singapore in 1988 to offer a three-year curriculum leading to the Singapore Cambridge General Certificate of Education Advanced Level examination. It was located at Margaret Drive in Queenstown. The former site of Townsville institute now houses the National Institute of Education Townsville campus.

=== Closure of Townsville and Seletar Institutes ===
With a fall in demand in three-year pre-university courses in favour of two-year junior college courses, Seletar Institute witnessed a rapidly falling enrolment, to 130 students in 1995. In November 1995, the Ministry of Education announced the closure of Seletar Institute and Townsville Institute owing to the rapidly falling enrolment, from 3560 students in 1993 to 2328 students in 1995. Both institutes ceased the intake of first-year students in 1996, and ceased operation in 1998 with the graduation of its final batch of students.

=== Merger of Outram and Jurong Institutes and establishment of Millennia Institute ===
On 26 July 2003, decision was made public by the Ministry of Education on the merger of Outram Institute and Jurong Institute to conglomerate the sparsely organised three-year pre-university institutions into a single entity. This move was to allow consolidation of expertise and teaching resources of the two institutes, and provide students with more customised programmes and facilities, thereby enhancing the delivery of the three-year pre-university education programme. As a result, Millennia Institute was established on 3 January 2004. A new campus was announced on 2 December 2003 to be ready in 2007.

Millennia Institute functioned in two campuses of the former Jurong Institute and Outram Institute, before relocating to its permanent campus at 60 Bukit Batok West Avenue 8.
