= List of secondary schools in Singapore =

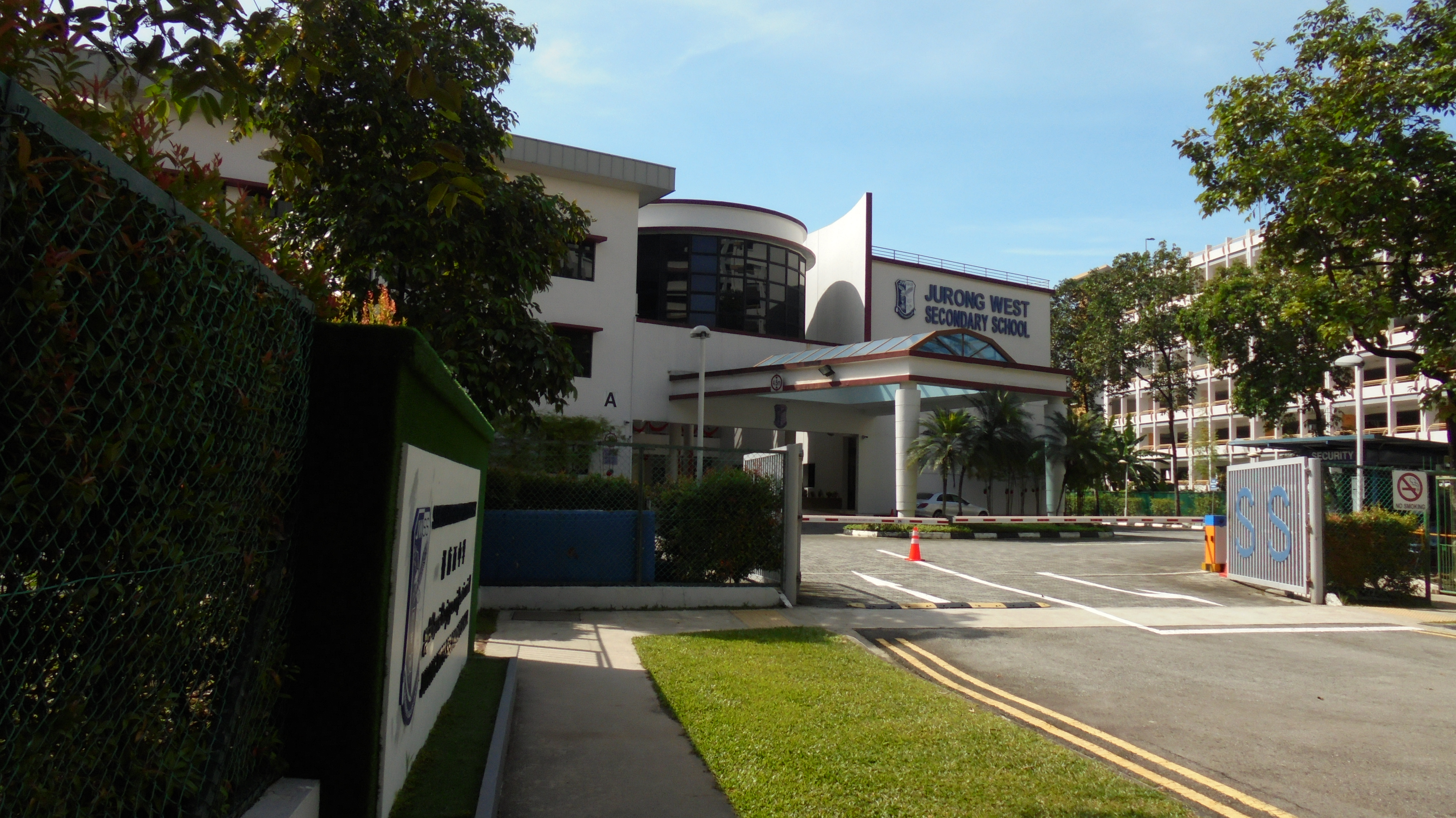
Entrance to Jurong West Secondary School, a secondary school in Singapore

This is a list of secondary schools in Singapore. Most secondary schools offer a four-year "express course", or a "special course" for Special Assistance Plan (SAP) schools, as well as a five-year "normal course", all of which lead to the Singapore-Cambridge GCE Ordinary Level (O-Levels) examinations. Students in the normal stream may instead sit for the Singapore-Cambridge GCE Normal Level examinations, either NA-Levels or NT-Levels, in their fourth year and continue along their respective post-secondary pathways. These students are however not eligible to enter junior colleges (JCs) to pursue the Singapore-Cambridge GCE Advanced Level (A-Levels), but typically progress to vocational schools such as polytechnics or the Institute of Technical Education (ITE). Some schools also offer a six-year Integrated Programme (IP) for more academically inclined students. This pathway leads directly to the A-Levels examinations or the International Baccalaureate Diploma (IB), bypassing the O-Levels entirely. Depending on results, these qualifications allow for direct admission into universities.

In 2019, the Ministry of Education (MOE) announced that 2026 would be the final examination year for the O-Levels, NA-Levels and NT-Levels. From 2027, all Secondary 4 students will instead take the Singapore-Cambridge Secondary Education Certificate (SEC), which consolidates the three qualifications into a single certificate. This change aligns with the removal of secondary school streaming from 2024, which had previously divided students into separate academic tracks, and was introduced to promote social mobility and reduce elitist perceptions within the education system.

There are also different types of secondary schools in Singapore, depending on their links with the government based on the school's history. Autonomous schools have relatively more autonomy as compared to other government-run secondary schools to plan their own curriculum and activities. However, such schools may charge additional, miscellaneous fees on top of the regular school fees paid by all students attending government or government-aided schools. Independent schools are granted complete autonomy to its own school curriculum, programmes and school fees, the latter of which are significantly higher than government schools. Since the start of the 21st century, a number of secondary schools in Singapore have undergone mergers due to falling birth rates and demographic shifts.

== Overview ==
=== Current mainstream schools ===
Name	Type	School Code	Planning area	Notes / Affiliations (Admissions / Academic Programmes)	Website
Admiralty Secondary School	Government	3072	Woodlands	Extra Information: Cut Off point: 6-10	
Ahmad Ibrahim Secondary School	Government	3201	Yishun		
Anderson Secondary School	Government; Autonomous	3001	Ang Mo Kio	From: 6.45a.m. to 3p.m. average school hours.	
Anglican High School	Government-aided; Autonomous; SAP	7101	Bedok		
Anglo-Chinese School (Barker Road)	Government-aided	7032	Newton	Affiliated to: Anglo-Chinese Junior College	
Anglo-Chinese School (Independent)	Independent/IP	IP: 9161; Express: 7001	Queenstown	Offers the International Baccalaureate certificate; Affiliated to: Methodist Girls' School (Secondary) (IP)	
Ang Mo Kio Secondary School	Government	3026	Ang Mo Kio		
Assumption English School	Government-aided	7002	Bukit Panjang	Affiliated to: Catholic Junior College (Non-IP)	
Bartley Secondary School	Government	3002	Toa Payoh		
Beatty Secondary School	Government	3003	Toa Payoh		
Bedok Green Secondary School	Government	3069	Bedok		
Bedok South Secondary School	Government	3027	Bedok		
Bedok View Secondary School	Government	3225	Bedok		
Bendemeer Secondary School	Government	3021	Kallang		
Boon Lay Secondary School	Government	3224	Jurong West		
Bowen Secondary School	Government	3043	Hougang		
Broadrick Secondary School	Government	3202	Geylang		
Bukit Batok Secondary School	Government	3044	Bukit Batok		
Bukit Merah Secondary School	Government	3203	Bukit Merah		
Bukit Panjang Government High School	Government; Autonomous	3204	Choa Chu Kang		
Bukit View Secondary School	Government	3040	Bukit Batok		
Catholic High School	Government-aided; Autonomous; SAP; IP	IP: 9131; Special: 7102	Bishan	Affiliated to: Eunoia Junior College (IP); Singapore Chinese Girls' School (IP), CHIJ Saint Nicholas Girls' School (IP); Catholic Junior College (Non-IP)	
Canberra Secondary School	Government	3621	Sembawang		
Cedar Girls' Secondary School	Government; Autonomous; IP	IP: 9152; Express: 3004	Toa Payoh	Affiliated to: Victoria Junior College (IP); Victoria School (IP)	
Changkat Changi Secondary School	Government	3402	Simei		
CHIJ Katong Convent (Secondary)	Government-aided; Autonomous	7008	Marine Parade	Affiliated to: Catholic Junior College (Non-IP); CHIJ Katong (Primary)	
CHIJ Secondary (Toa Payoh)	Government-aided; Autonomous	7004	Toa Payoh	Affiliated to: Catholic Junior College (Non-IP); CHIJ Primary (Toa Payoh)	
CHIJ St. Joseph's Convent	Government-aided	7019	Sengkang	Affiliated to: Catholic Junior College (Non-IP); CHIJ Our Lady of the Nativity & CHIJ Our Lady of Good Counsel	
CHIJ St. Nicholas Girls' School	Government-aided; Autonomous; SAP; IP	IP: 9134; Special: 7118	Ang Mo Kio	Affiliated to: Eunoia Junior College (IP), Singapore Chinese Girls' School (IP) & Catholic High School (IP); Catholic Junior College (Non-IP); CHIJ St. Nicholas Girls' School (Primary)	
CHIJ St. Theresa's Convent	Government-aided	7023	Bukit Merah	Affiliated to: Catholic Junior College (Non-IP); CHIJ (Kellock), CHIJ Our Lady Queen of Peace	
Chua Chu Kang Secondary School	Government	3055	Choa Chu Kang		
Christ Church Secondary School	Government-aided	7025	Woodlands	Affiliated to: St. Andrews Junior College (Non-IP)	
Chung Cheng High School (Main)	Government-aided; Autonomous; SAP	7104	Marine Parade	Affiliated to: Nanyang Junior College (Non-IP); Chung Cheng High School (Yishun) (Non-IP)	
Chung Cheng High School (Yishun)	Government-aided	7105	Yishun	Affiliated to: Nanyang Junior College (Non-IP); Chung Cheng High School (Main) (Non-IP)	
Clementi Town Secondary School	Government	3029	Clementi		
Commonwealth Secondary School	Government; Autonomous	3012	Jurong East		
Compassvale Secondary School	Government	3622	Sengkang		
Crescent Girls' School	Government; Autonomous	3005	Bukit Merah		
Damai Secondary School	Government	3056	Bedok		
Deyi Secondary School	Government	3228	Ang Mo Kio		
Dunearn Secondary School	Government	3503	Bukit Batok		
Dunman High School	Government; Autonomous; SAP; IP	3101	Kallang		
Dunman Secondary School	Government; Autonomous	3207	Tampines		
East Spring Secondary School	Government	3609	Tampines		
Edgefield Secondary School	Government	3075	Punggol		
Evergreen Secondary School	Government	3623	Woodlands		
Fairfield Methodist School (Secondary)	Government-aided; Autonomous	7309	Queenstown	Affiliated to: Anglo-Chinese Junior College (Non-IP); Fairfield Methodist School (Primary)	
Fuhua Secondary School	Government	3614	Jurong West		
Gan Eng Seng School	Government	3006	Bukit Merah		
Geylang Methodist School (Secondary)	Government-aided	7005	Geylang	Affiliated to: Anglo-Chinese Junior College (Non-IP); Geylang Methodist School (Primary)	
Greendale Secondary School	Government	3074	Punggol		
Greenridge Secondary School	Government	3051	Bukit Panjang		
Guangyang Secondary School	Government	3238	Bishan		
Hai Sing Catholic School	Government-aided	7031	Pasir Ris	Affiliated to: Catholic Junior College (Non-IP)	
Hillgrove Secondary School	Government	3048	Bukit Batok		
Holy Innocents' High School	Government-aided	7108	Hougang	Affiliated to: Catholic Junior College (Non-IP); Holy Innocents' Primary School	
Hougang Secondary School	Government	3046	Hougang		
Hua Yi Secondary School	Government	3226	Jurong West		
Hwa Chong Institution	Independent; SAP; IP	0806	Bukit Timah	Offers the Hwa Chong Diploma; Affiliated to: Nanyang Girls' High School (IP)	
Junyuan Secondary School	Government	3608	Tampines		
Jurong Secondary School	Government	3211	Jurong West		
Jurong West Secondary School	Government	3068	Jurong West		
Jurongville Secondary School	Government	3063	Jurong East		
Juying Secondary School	Government	3066	Jurong West		
Kent Ridge Secondary School	Government	3619	Clementi		
Kranji Secondary School	Government	3065	Choa Chu Kang		
Kuo Chuan Presbyterian Secondary School	Government-aided	7028	Bishan	Affiliated to: St. Andrews Junior College (Non-IP); Kuo Chuan Presbyterian Primary School	
Loyang View Secondary School	Government	3049	Pasir Ris		
Manjusri Secondary School	Government-aided	7307	Geylang	Affiliated to: Mee Toh School, Maha Bodhi School	
Maris Stella High School	Government-aided; Autonomous; SAP	7111	Toa Payoh	Affiliated to: Catholic Junior College (Non-IP); Maris Stella High School (Primary)	
Marsiling Secondary School	Government	3615	Woodlands		
Mayflower Secondary School	Government	3031	Ang Mo Kio		
Meridian Secondary School	Government	3076	Pasir Ris		
Methodist Girls' School (Secondary)	Independent; IP	IP: 9162; Express: 7030	Bukit Timah	Affiliated to: Anglo-Chinese School (Independent) (IP); Methodist Girls' School (Primary)	
Montfort Secondary School	Government-aided	7011	Hougang	Affiliated to: Catholic Junior College (Non-IP); Montfort Junior School	
Nan Chiau High School	Government-aided; SAP	7112	Sengkang	Affiliated to: Singapore Hokkien Huay Kuan	
Nan Hua High School	Government; Autonomous; SAP	3047	Clementi		
Nanyang Girls' High School	Independent; SAP; IP	7114	Bukit Timah	Offers the Hwa Chong Diploma; Affiliated to: Hwa Chong Institution (IP); Nanyang Primary School	
National Junior College	Government IP	0701	Bukit Timah		
Naval Base Secondary School	Government	3214	Yishun		
New Town Secondary School	Government	3507	Queenstown		
Ngee Ann Secondary School	Government-aided; Autonomous	7310	Tampines	Affiliated to: Ngee Ann Primary School	
North Vista Secondary School	Government	3071	Sengkang		
Northbrooks Secondary School	Government	3612	Yishun		
Northland Secondary School	Government	3058	Yishun		
NUS High School of Math and Science	Independent; Specialised; IP	7801	Clementi	Offers the NUS High School Diploma; Admit students through DSA and/or Independent Intake	
Orchid Park Secondary School	Government	3605	Yishun		
Outram Secondary School	Government	3215	Central		
Pasir Ris Crest Secondary School	Government	3613	Pasir Ris		
Pasir Ris Secondary School	Government	3235	Tampines		
Paya Lebar Methodist Girls' School (Secondary)	Government-aided; Autonomous	7026	Hougang	Affiliated to: Anglo-Chinese Junior College (Non-IP); Paya Lebar Methodist Girls' School (Primary)	
Pei Hwa Secondary School	Government-aided	3073	Sengkang		
Peicai Secondary School	Government	3232	Serangoon		
Peirce Secondary School	Government	3061	Bishan		
Presbyterian High School	Government-aided	7308	Ang Mo Kio	Affiliated to: St. Andrews Junior College (Non-IP)	
Punggol Secondary School	Government	3070	Punggol		
Queenstown Secondary School	Government	3508	Queenstown		
Queensway Secondary School	Government	3007	Queenstown		
Raffles Girls' School (Secondary)	Independent; IP	3008	Bishan	Offers the Raffles Diploma; Affiliated to: Raffles Institution (IP)	
Raffles Institution	Independent; IP	3009	Bishan	Offers the Raffles Diploma; Affiliated to: Raffles Girls' School (IP)	
Regent Secondary School	Government	3618	Choa Chu Kang		
Riverside Secondary School	Government	3239	Woodlands		
River Valley High School	Government; Autonomous; SAP; IP	3103	Boon Lay		
St Andrew's School (Secondary)	Government-aided	7015	Potong Pasir		
St. Patrick's School	Government-aided	7022	Bedok		
School of Science and Technology, Singapore	Independent; Specialised	7805	Commonwealth West	Admit students through DSA and/or Independent Intake; Offers GCE O' Level certificate via the Special/Express course; Affiliated to: Ngee Ann Polytechnic (IDP)	
School of the Arts	Independent; Specialised	7802	Dhoby Ghaut	Admit students through DSA and/or Independent Intake; Offers the International Baccalaureate certificate	
Sembawang Secondary School	Government	3606	Sembawang		
Sengkang Secondary School	Government	3607	Sengkang		
Serangoon Garden Secondary School	Government	3509	Serangoon		
Serangoon Secondary School	Government	3010	Hougang		
Singapore Chinese Girls' School	Independent; IP	IP: 9132; Express: 7014	Novena	Affiliated to: Eunoia Junior College (IP), CHIJ St Nicholas Girls' School (IP) & Catholic High School (IP); Singapore Chinese Girls' School (Primary)	
Singapore Sports School	Independent; Specialised	7800	Woodlands	Admit students through DSA and/or Independent Intake	
Springfield Secondary School	Government	3053	Tampines		
St. Anthony's Canossian Secondary School	Government-aided; Autonomous	7016	Bedok	Affiliated to: Catholic Junior College (Non-IP); Canossa Convent Primary School, St Anthony's Canossian Primary School	
St. Gabriel's Secondary School	Government-aided	7017	Serangoon	Affiliated to: Catholic Junior College (Non-IP); St. Gabriel's Primary School	
St. Hilda's Secondary School	Government-aided	7029	Tampines	Affiliated to: St. Andrews Junior College (Non-IP); St. Hilda's Primary School	
St. Margaret's Secondary School	Government-aided; Autonomous	7021	Bukit Timah		
St. Joseph's Institution	Independent; IP	IP: 9141; Express: 7020	Novena	Affiliated to: Catholic Junior College (Non-IP); De la Salle School, St. Joseph's Institution Junior, St. Stephen's School, St. Anthony's Primary School	
Swiss Cottage Secondary School	Government	3304	Bukit Batok		
Tanglin Secondary School	Government	3511	Clementi		
Tampines Secondary School	Government	3037	Tampines		
Tanjong Katong Girls' School	Government; Autonomous	3013	Marine Parade		
Tanjong Katong Secondary School	Government; Autonomous	3512	Marine Parade		
Temasek Junior College	Government IP	0702	Bedok		
Temasek Secondary School	Government; Autonomous	3030	Bedok		
Unity Secondary School	Government	3611	Choa Chu Kang		
Victoria School	Government; Autonomous; IP	IP: 9151; Express: 3014	Marine Parade	Affiliated to: Victoria Junior College (IP); Cedar Girls' Secondary School (IP)	
West Spring Secondary School	Government	3067	Bukit Panjang		
Westwood Secondary School	Government	3620	Jurong West		
Whitley Secondary School	Government	3015	Bishan		
Woodgrove Secondary School	Government	3616	Woodlands		
Woodlands Ring Secondary School	Government	3604	Woodlands		
Woodlands Secondary School	Government	3041	Woodlands		
Xinmin Secondary School	Government; Autonomous	3050	Hougang		
Yio Chu Kang Secondary School	Government	3222	Ang Mo Kio		
Yishun Secondary School	Government	3020	Yishun		
Yishun Town Secondary School	Government; Autonomous	3045	Yishun		
Yuan Ching Secondary School	Government	3223	Jurong West		
Yuhua Secondary School	Government	3019	Jurong West		
Yusof Ishak Secondary School	Government	3307	Punggol		
Yuying Secondary School	Government-aided	7027	Hougang		
Zhenghua Secondary School	Government	3617	Bukit Panjang		
Zhonghua Secondary School	Government; Autonomous	3240	Serangoon		

=== Current religious schools ===
==== Christian schools ====
Name	Type	Area	Affiliated denomination	Notes	Website
San Yu Adventist School	Private	Novena	Seventh-day Adventist Church		

==== Madrasahs ====
Name	Type	Area	Notes	Website
Madrasah Aljunied Al-Islamiah	Independent	Rochor		
Madrasah Irsyad Zuhri Al-Islamiah	Independent	Braddell		
Madrasah Al-Arabiah Al-Islamiah	Independent	Toa Payoh		
Madrasah Al-Maarif Al-Islamiah	Independent	Geylang		
Madrasah Alsagoff Al-Arabiah	Independent	Rochor		
Madrasah Wak Tanjong Al-Islamiah	Independent	Paya Lebar		

=== Special schools specifically for NT students ===
Name	Type	Area	Notes	Website
Crest Secondary School	Government	Jurong East		
Spectra Secondary School	Government	Woodlands		

=== Secondary schools for individuals with special needs ===
Name	Type	Area	Notes	Website
Assumption Pathway School		Bukit Timah		
NorthLight School	Government	Kallang		
Pathlight School	Government	Ang Mo Kio		

== See also ==
- List of schools in Singapore
