= Pei Hwa Secondary School =

- 培华中学; Sekolah Menengah Pei Hwa

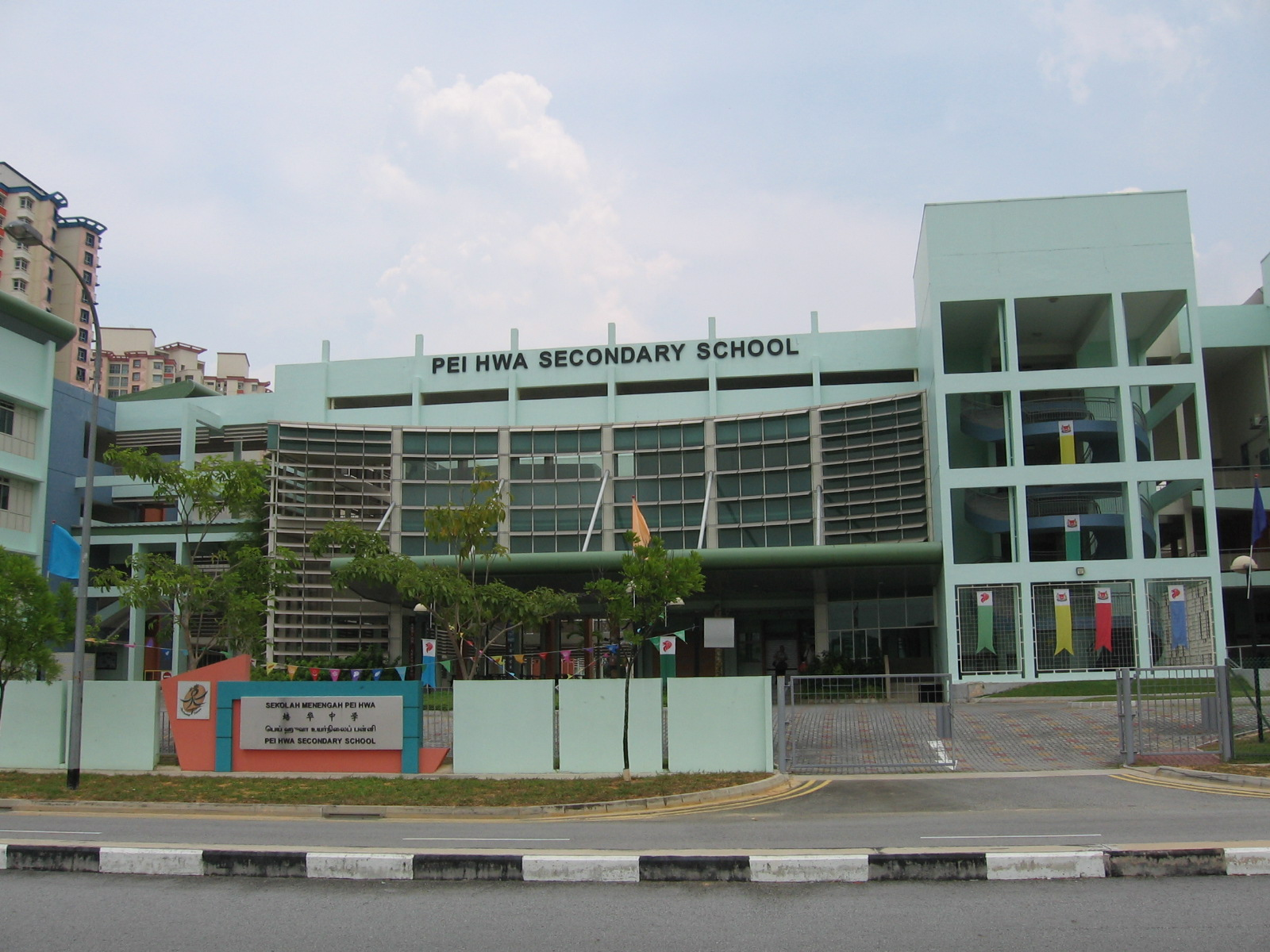

Location
- 21 Fernvale Link, Singapore 797702; Singapore; 1.3906°N 103.8785°E

Information
- Type: Government-aided; Co-educational
- Motto: Nurturing Talents
- Established: 2005; 21 years ago (first founded: 1934; 92 years ago)
- School code: 3073
- Principal: Mohd Azhar B. Terimo
- Enrolment: approx. 1400+ (October 2023)
- Colour: Green White
- Website: http://www.peihwasec.moe.edu.sg/

Pei Hwa Secondary School (PHSS) (Chinese: 培华中学; pinyin: Péihuá Zhōngxué) is a co-educational government-aided secondary school in Fernvale Link, Singapore within walking distance of Fernvale and Layar LRT stations. Re-established in 2005, Pei Hwa Secondary School was first founded in 1934 as Pei Hwa Public School.

== History ==
=== Pei Hwa Secondary School ===
Pei Hwa Public School along Yio Chu Kang Road was founded in 1934 as Hwa Keow School by Pial Ragnapuram Gopal, who felt a need for a school in proximity to their villages because most schools were located in the cities and not everyone had the means to send their children to and from the city. Pei Hwa Public School started as a small village school with 17 classrooms and a dormitory for the principal and teachers.

In 1935, the elders in the village with the support of shop owners started to raise funds for the construction of a school campus. A few months later, two classrooms, an office and two dormitories were erected at the opposite of the school premises. The school was registered in 1936 as Pei Hwa Public School.

The school was forced to close due to the Japanese occupation, and re-opened on 8 October 1945 with about two hundred pupils. It took two years to repair the damages caused during the occupation. With an increase in student population over the late 1940s and early 1950s, facilities were insufficient to meet the demands of the education system. The School Management Committee formed a School Construction Sub-committee, which looked for an alternative site and began a donation drive and fund raising. A collective sum of more than seventy thousand dollars was raised from enterprises and the general public and used to purchase a five-acre site along Yio Chu Kang Rd from Hock Ann Company.

Building construction began in June 1954 and was completed in December, costing $130,000. The new school comprised a two-storey building with twelve classrooms, an office, a library, a store room, a visitors' lounge, a bookshop and a canteen.

=== Transformation as a government-aided school ===
Pei Hua Public became a government-aided school in 1955 and the second phase of the school construction, which included an assembly hall, was completed in 1961. The school continued to be upgraded throughout the 1970s, including a library, language laboratories, and science and music rooms, and stayed as a well- equipped Chinese school in the Yio Chu Kang area. In 1978, it started to register pupils for the English stream and in the following year, pre-primary education was introduced. The school reached its peak by having 34 classes and was one of 28 primary schools receiving prioritised attention from the Ministry.

As a traditional Chinese school, the students took Chinese as their main language together with Mathematics, Moral Education, Physical Education and Arts and Crafts. Extra-Curriculum Activities (ECAs) were also rolled out along with Ministry of Education guidelines since 1979.

In the late 1980s, the enrolment to the school began to dwindle as many of the surrounding villages were gradually relocated under the redevelopment scheme to new HDB housing estates. Efforts were made to alleviate the situation. The library was re-renovated, and more books in English were added to boost the pupils' standard in English. Many projects in English were implemented. Outdoor activities and games were encouraged and the school participated in competitions. At the end of 1990, the decision was made to close Pei Hwa Public School. Pupils and teachers thereafter were transferred to other schools by the Ministry of Education.

=== Re-establishment as Pei Hwa Secondary School ===
In 2004, the idea of resurrecting Pei Hwa arose from a group of former students who had since started the Pei Hwa Foundation, a philanthropic organization founded on the principles of contribution to the community for the betterment of those living there. The re-established school is located at 21 Fernvale Link, a 15-minute drive from the original site of the Pei Hwa Public School. The school was officially opened on 28 July 2007 by then Minister for Education Tharman Shammugaratnam, along with members of the Pei Hwa Foundation and the School Advisory Committee.

== Principals ==
Name of principal	Years served
Chong Hoi Neng	2005–2008
Lim Ai Poo	2009–2015
Belinda Chan	2016–2021
Mohd Azhar B. Terimo	2022–present

== Academic information ==
As a government secondary school, Pei Hwa Secondary School offers three academic streams, namely the four-year Express course, as well as the Normal Course, comprising Normal (Academic) and Normal (Technical) academic tracks. Since 2020, the Singapore government selected Pei Hwa as one of 28 schools for its Subject-Based Banding pilot programme.

=== GCE O Level Express Course ===
The Express Course is a nationwide four-year programme that leads up to the Singapore-Cambridge GCE Ordinary Level examination.

==== Academic subjects ====
The examinable academic subjects for Singapore-Cambridge GCE Ordinary Level offered by Pei Hwa Secondary School for upper secondary level (via streaming in Secondary 2 level), as of 2022, are listed below.

Notes:

1. Subjects indicated with ' * ' are mandatory subjects.
2. All students in Singapore are required to undertake a Mother Tongue Language as an examinable subject, as indicated by ' ^ '.
3. "SPA" in Pure Science subjects refers to the incorporation of School-based Science Practical Assessment, which 20% of the subject result in the national examination are determined by school-based practical examinations, supervised by the Singapore Examinations and Assessment Board. The SPA Assessment has been replaced by one Practical Assessment in the 2018 O Levels.

Sciences	Language & Humanities	Arts & Aesthetics
Additional Mathematics; Mathematics*; Physics (SPA); Chemistry (SPA)*; Biology (SPA); Science (Combined)	English Language*; English Literature; Mother Tongue Language* ^; Higher Mother Tongue Language; Geography; History; Combined Humanities (Social Studies & another humanities subject at elective level)*; Principles of Accounts	Art; Design & Technology; Music; FCE

=== Normal/Express Course ===
The Normal Course is a nationwide 4-year programme leading to the Singapore-Cambridge GCE Normal Level examination, which runs either the Normal (Academic) curriculum or Normal (Technical) curriculum, abbreviated as N(A) and N(T) respectively.

==== Normal (Academic) Course ====
In the Normal (Academic) Course, students offer 5-8 subjects in the Singapore-Cambridge GCE Normal Level examination. Compulsory subjects include:

- English Language
- Mother Tongue Language
- Mathematics
- Combined Humanities

A 5th year leading to the Singapore-Cambridge GCE Ordinary Level examination is available to N(A) students who perform well in their Singapore-Cambridge GCE Normal Level examination. Students can move from one course to another based on their performance and the assessment of the school principal and teachers.

==== Normal (Technical) Course ====
The Normal (Technical) Course prepares students for a technical-vocational education at the Institute of Technical Education. Students will offer 5-7 subjects in the Singapore-Cambridge GCE Normal Level examination. The curriculum is tailored towards strengthening students' proficiency in English and Mathematics. Students take English Language, Mathematics, Basic Mother Tongue and Computer Applications as compulsory subjects.
