= Melaphone Speech Unit =

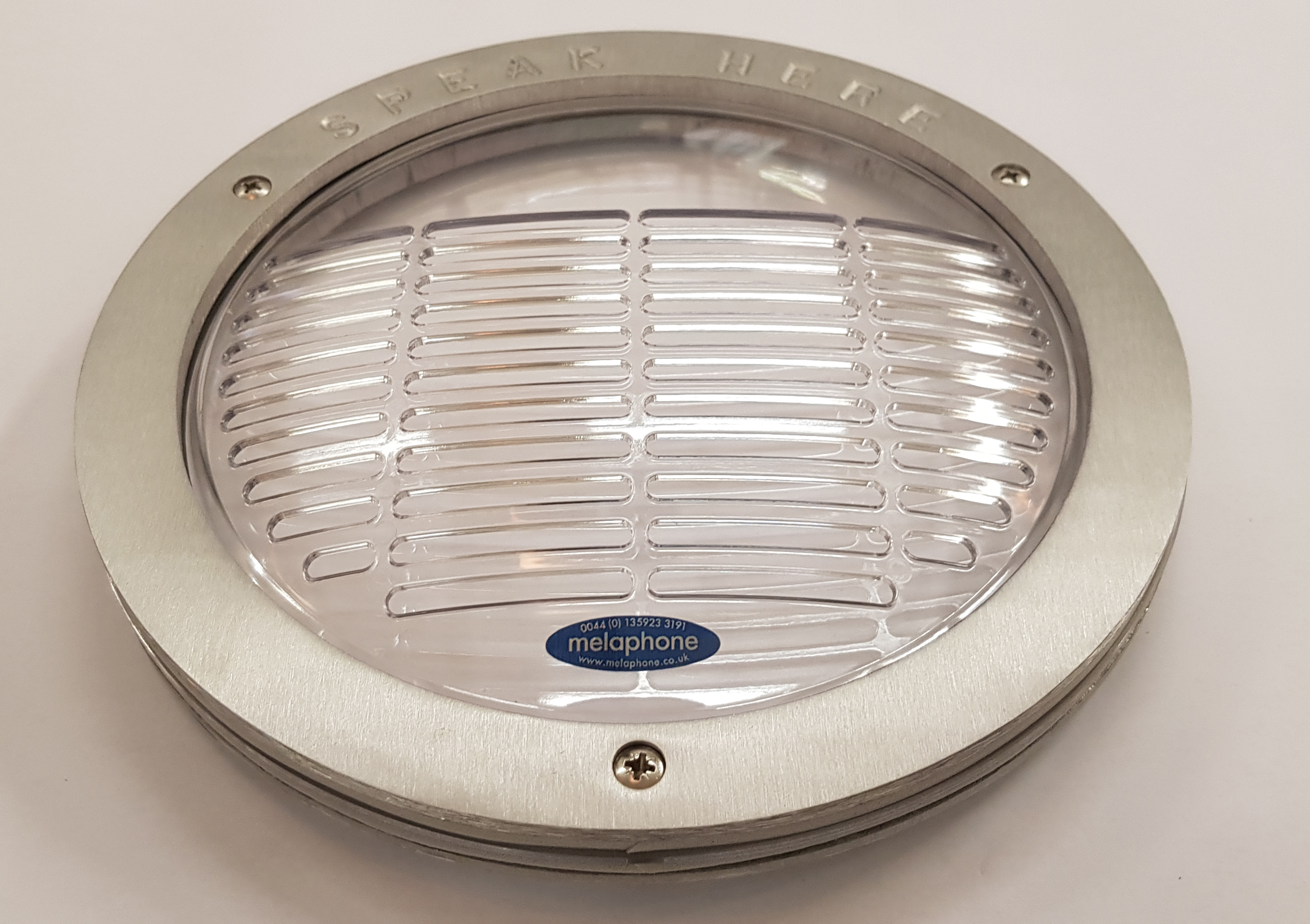
Melaphone Brushed aluminum 1001 9" unit

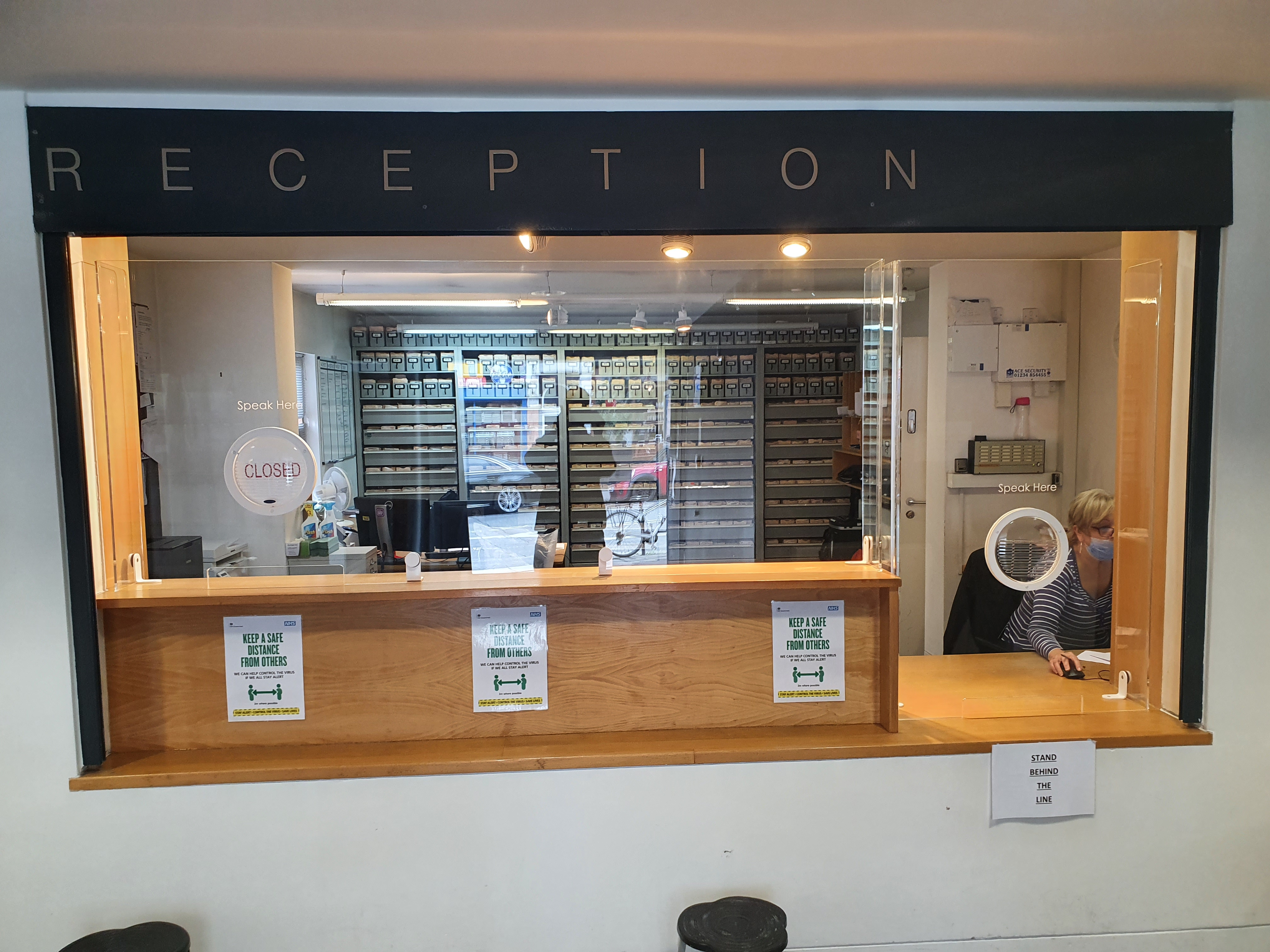
Mildmay Medical Practice

The Melaphone Speech Unit was designed in 1970 for booking offices at British Rail stations and has been used for communication in environments such as laboratories and cleanrooms where it offers protection from air-borne viruses and pathogens. The COVID-19 pandemic generated new interest in the product which has a resonating membrane and air-sealed construction. Used extensively in hospitals and doctors surgerys across the world, it can increase sound pressure level or voice level by more than four decibels, as compared with wearing a mask alone. Tested and certified to ISO14644-1 Level 5, the Melaphone is proven to prevent germ and air-borne pathogens from being transmitted during close contact conversation.

It is built into the new Defender Virus Screens produced by the original manufacturers, Melaphone VisAudio of London, which has been installed in many doctors’ surgeries, medical centres, clinics and pharmacies in the United Kingdom. A similar product has been produced by the Institute of Technical Education in Singapore.
