= Hua Yi Secondary School =

- 华义中学; Sekolah Menengah Hua Yi

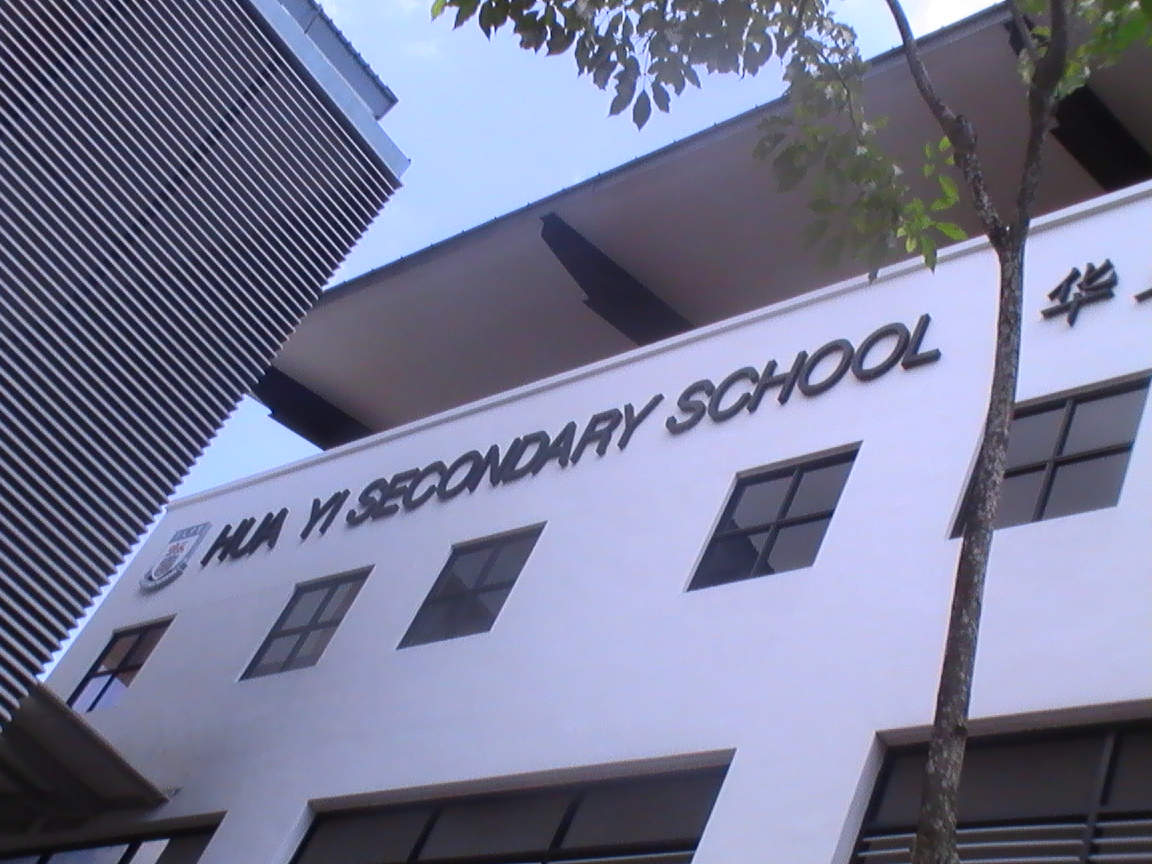
- 60 Jurong West Street 42; Jurong West; Singapore 649371; Singapore

Information
- Type: Government; Co-educational
- Founded: 14 October 1956; 69 years ago
- Session: Single-session
- School code: 3226
- Principal: Dr Lim Siew Yee
- Enrolment: Approx. 1250
- Language: English, Chinese
- Colour: Red Blue White

Hua Yi Secondary School (abbreviation: HYSS) is a government secondary school located in Jurong West, Singapore.

Founded in 1956 as Hua Yi Government Chinese Middle School.

== School history ==
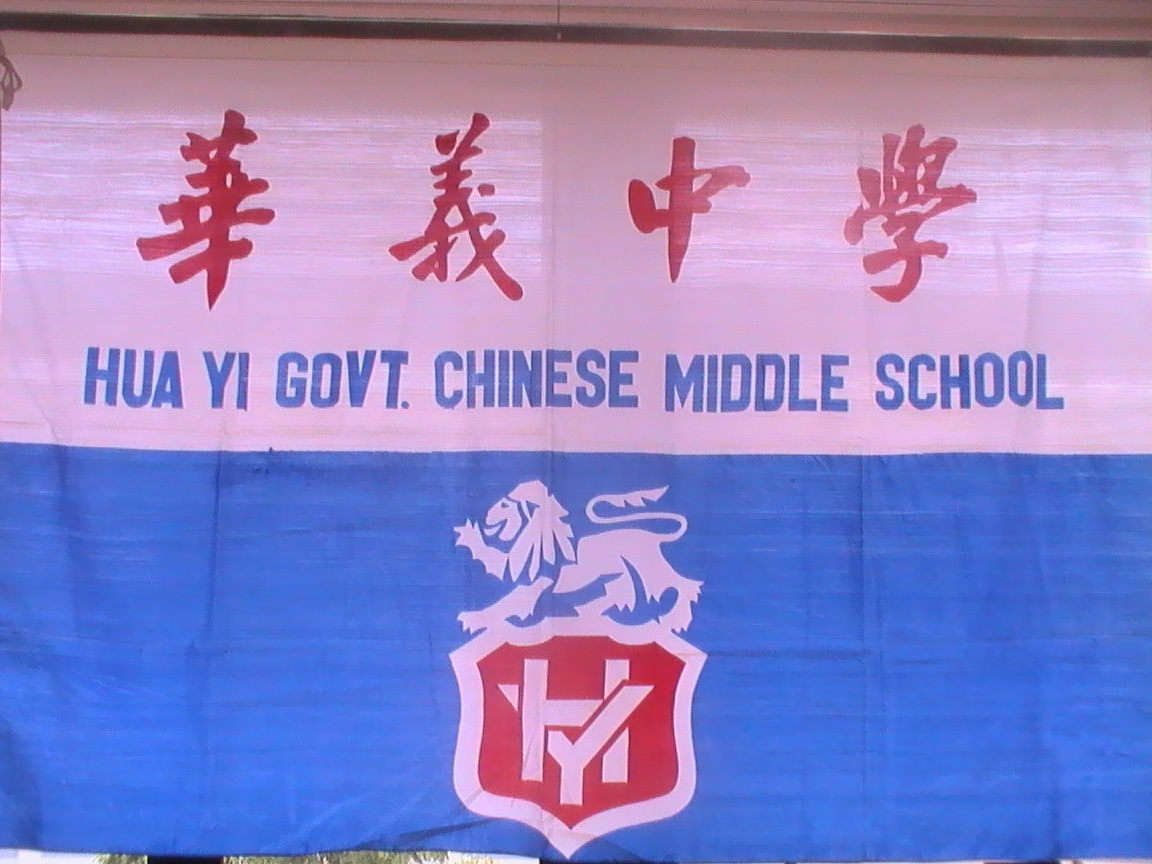
Former flag of Hua Yi

Formerly known as Hua Yi Government Chinese Middle School (华义政府华文中学), the school was first established on 14 October 1956. It was founded by Chinese philanthropists and clan leaders, and was one of the earliest government-aided schools formed during the period of Singapore's self-governance. Located at Fowlie Road, the school started with just 578 pupils and 26 classes. The school then shifted to Windstedt Road in 1957, where the enrollment rose to a total of 1,079 pupils in 30 classes.

In December 1957, the school was given her own school building at Margaret Drive. It officially started functioning at its own premises in 1958. Over time, the school expanded with the addition of new facilities to the original building, to cater to the growing needs of the students. Hua Yi Government Chinese School rose to become a premier Chinese school at that time, together with Dunman High and River Valley High, excelling academically and in sports. In the late 1970s, due to a reduced number of Chinese-language students, the school opened up English-language classes and became an integrated school.

As the student intake increased progressively, a decision was made to relocate Hua Yi to bigger premises. The big shift to the new building in Depot Road took place in March 1983, and was officially declared open by the Honourable Dr Koh Lam Son, Member of Parliament for Telok Blangah, on 26 April 1985. It was then when Hua Yi transformed from a Chinese medium school to an English medium school.

In December 1999, Hua Yi moved to an even bigger premises at the present Jurong West Street 42. It was seen as a "new era" because the school was then well-equipped with new facilities. It opened its doors to its first batch of Secondary One students on 3 January 2000. It was also this time when part of the school's staff members was selected by the ministry to start Westwood Secondary School, which occupied a classroom block in the premise during the academic year of 2000 and used the premise's facilities with the school before moving to its own premise approximately 2.4 km away at Jurong West Street 25 in 2001. Hua Yi's new premise was officially declared open on 29 June 2002 by Mr Lim Boon Heng, Member of Parliament for Jurong GRC.

Hua Yi celebrated its 55th anniversary in 2011 and celebrated their 60th anniversary this year in 2016, with Prime Minister Lee Hsien Loong as the Guest of Honour during the appreciation dinner.

== Notable alumni ==
- Huang Qing Yuan (黄清元): 60s-80s singer; Known as the Elvis Presley of Singapore
- Hong Huifang (洪慧芳): Actress, Mediacorp

== Gallery ==
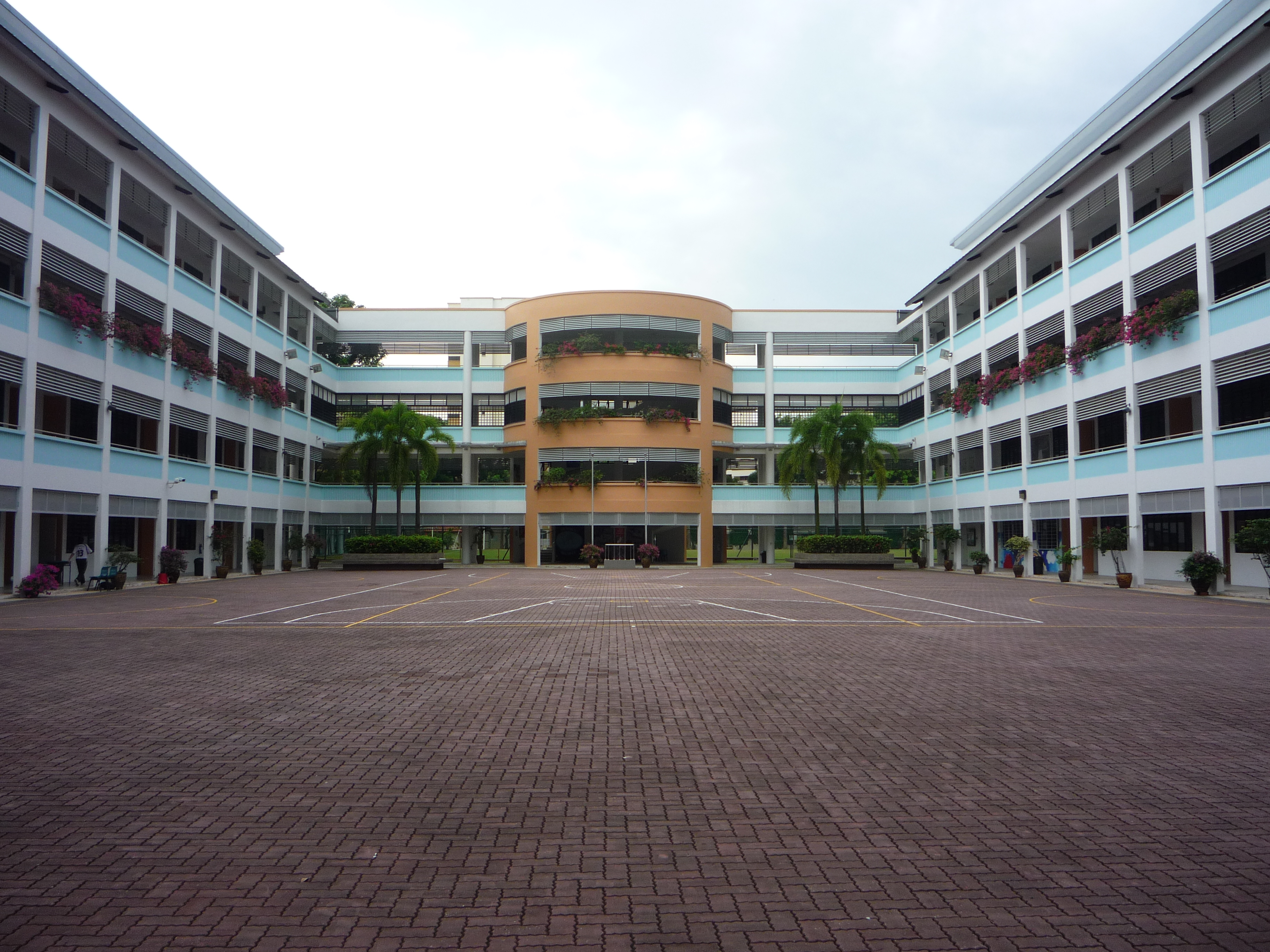
Quadrangle of Hua Yi Secondary School.

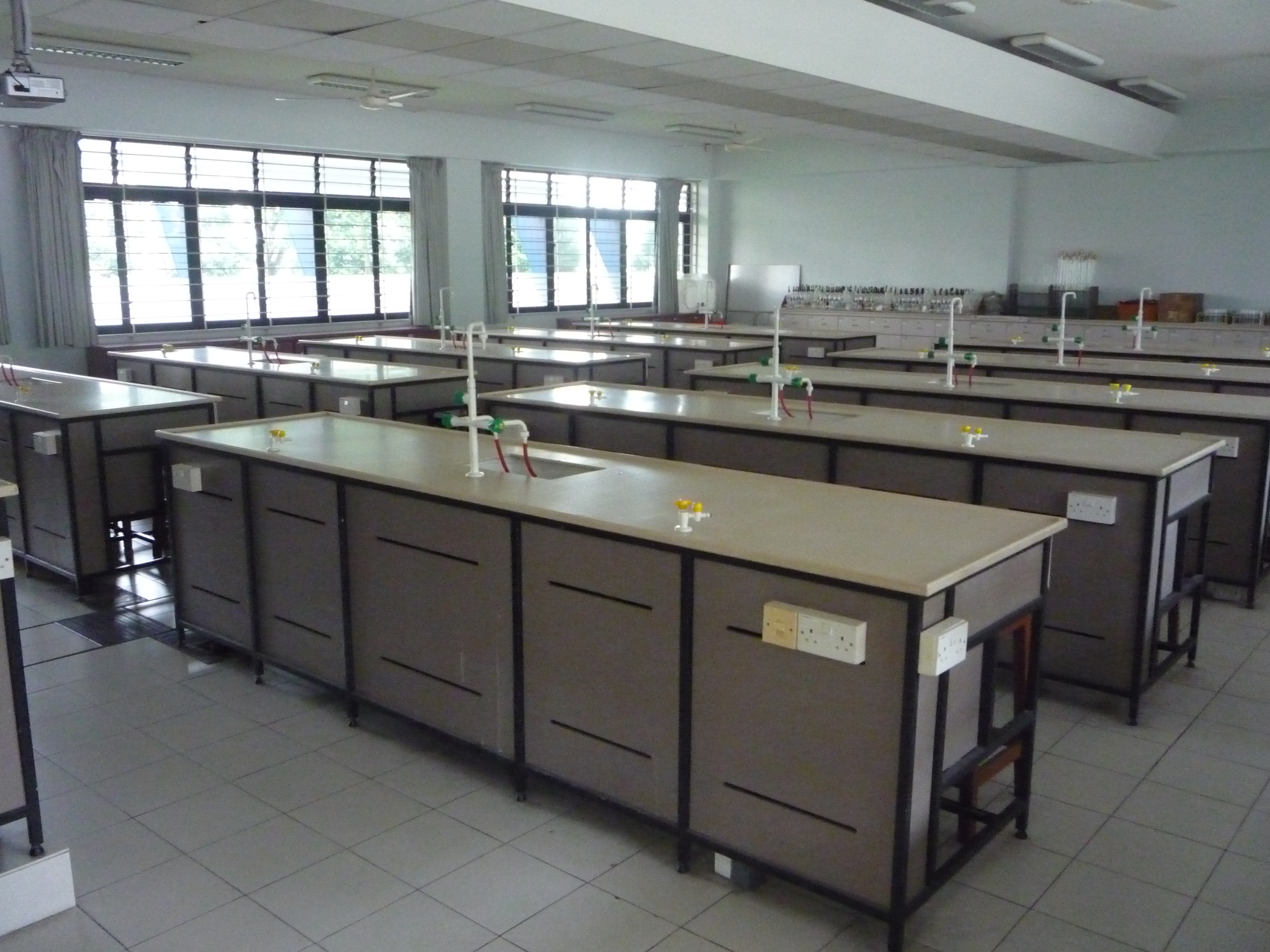
Chemistry Laboratory of the institution.

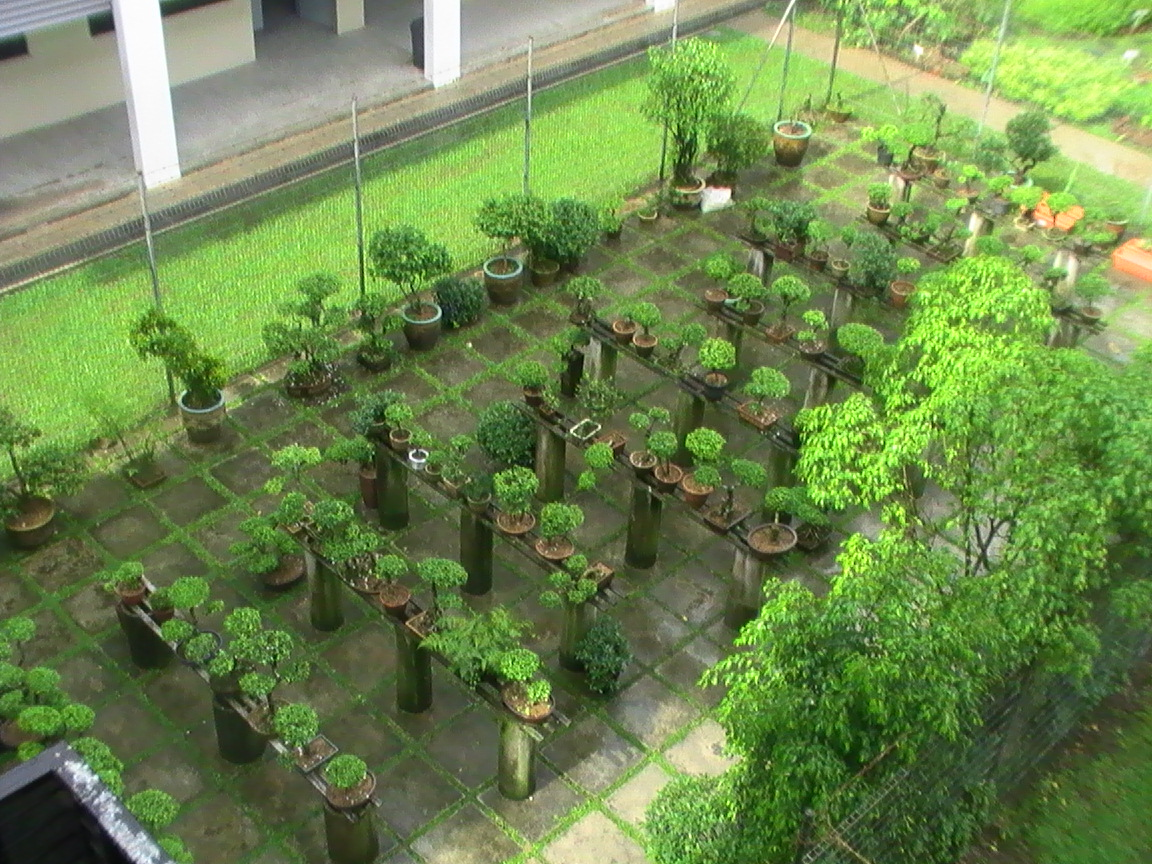
The iconic Bonsai Garden of Hua Yi Secondary School.

== See also ==
List of schools in Singapore
