= School-based Science Practical Assessment for GCE 'O' Level in Singapore =

The School-based Science Practical Assessment is a component in the Physics [Syllabus 5059], Chemistry [Syllabus 5073] and Biology [Syllabus 5158] subject assessment of the Singapore-Cambridge GCE Ordinary Level examination. It assesses candidates' competence in science practical skills over an appropriate period of time that the candidates are offered the subject, and constitutes 20% of the overall marks for the subject. SPA replaced the traditional Practical Examination, which was normally conducted at the end of the 2-year course, in 2006.

In 2018, the revision of the O Level Science Syllabus saw the SPA Component being phased out and replaced by the previous one-time Practical Examinations again. This would be the same for the A Level Science component, which would take place from 2017 onwards.
