= Deyi Secondary School =

- Sekolah Menengah Deyi 德义中学

Location
- 1 Ang Mo Kio Street 42; Ang Mo Kio, 569277; Singapore
- 1.3662°N 103.8505°E

Information
- Type: Government-aided
- Motto: Dedication & Integrity
- Established: January 1980; 46 years ago
- Session: Single
- School code: 3228
- Principal: Mr Chow Wei Si
- Enrolment: approx. 1090
- Colour: Blue White Yellow
- Website: http://www.deyisec.moe.edu.sg

Deyi Secondary School is a co-educational government secondary school located in Ang Mo Kio, Singapore. Founded in January 1980, having 1,200~ pupils. The school is remarked for its niche development in performing arts. An Aesthetics Development Programme (ADP) forms part of the niche development, which resulted in the Direct School Admission (DSA) status. This allows students, both local and abroad, talented in performing arts to be admitted into the school. All lower secondary students have drama and dance modules woven into the curriculum. There is a Talent Development programme leading to accreditation for performing arts students in collaboration with reputable institutions.

== History ==
The school first began operations in January 1980, as Teck Ghee Secondary School, with about 1,700 students. It was located at a 3.45 hectares (8.5 acres) campus along Ang Mo Kio Avenue 8 built at a cost of S$4.6 million. The then Teck Ghee Secondary started under the principalship of Mr Wu Tat Huan. It was officially opened on 5 May 1982 by Mr Lee Yock Suan, then Member of Parliament for Cheng San Constituency. In line with the use of Pinyin, the school took on Deyi Secondary School as the official name of the school in 1981.

A ceramic studio and a kiln were constructed in 1981.

The school changed its name to Deyi Secondary School in 1982.

Deyi Secondary School was then moved into its new premises on the 24th of June 2002. After which, it was officially declared opened by then Education Minister Tharman Shanmugaratnam on 20 May 2005.

== Co-curricular activities ==
Deyi has about 20 Co-curricular activities (CCAs) (robotics)(Now fewer as of May 2023) consisting of sports groups, uniformed groups, musical groups, clubs and societies, which can be viewed in the official Deyi Secondary School school website.

The school's performing arts have earned top places in several inter-school competitions, excel in English Drama, Movement and Dance, Military Band and Choir.

The Military Band has won the Gold with honours, Best Drum Major and Best display band of the year in 2008 and 2010.
