= Special Assistance Plan =

Multilingual academic programme in Singapore

The Special Assistance Plan (SAP; Chinese: 特别辅助计划; pinyin: Tèbié Fǔzhù Jìhuà) is a programme in Singapore introduced in 1979 which caters to academically strong students who excel in both their mother tongue as well as English. It is available only in selected primary and secondary schools. In a SAP school, several subjects may be taught in the mother tongue, alongside other subjects that are taught in English. Although SAP schools can theoretically be in any of the mother tongues of Singapore, only those catering to those studying Mandarin as their mother tongue currently exist.

== List of schools ==
Special Assistance Plan schools (or SAP schools, 特选学校) refers to schools that offers the Special Assistance Plan. The SAP is offered at both primary (elementary) school level as well as secondary (high school) level, in Special Assistance Plan primary schools (特选小学) and Special Assistance Plan high schools (特选中学) respectively.

=== SAP Primary Schools ===
Name	Type 2	Area	Notes	Website	GEP
Ai Tong School 爱同学校	Mixed	Bishan	Affiliated to Singapore Hokkien Huay Kuan		
Catholic High School (Affiliated Primary School) 公教中学 (附小)	Boys	Bishan			Yes
CHIJ St. Nicholas Girls' School (Affiliated Primary School) 圣尼格拉女校 (小学部)	Girls	Ang Mo Kio			
Holy Innocents’ Primary School 圣婴小学	Mixed	Hougang			
Hong Wen School 宏文学校	Mixed	Kallang			
Kong Hwa School 光华学校	Mixed	Geylang	Affiliated to Singapore Hokkien Huay Kuan		
Maha Bodhi School 菩提学校	Mixed	Geylang			
Maris Stella High School (Primary) 海星中学 (附小)	Boys	Toa Payoh			
Nan Hua Primary School 南华小学	Mixed	Clementi			Yes
Nanyang Primary School 南洋小学	Mixed	Bukit Timah			Yes
Pei Chun Public School 公立培群学校	Mixed	Toa Payoh			
Pei Hwa Presbyterian Primary School 培华长老会小学	Mixed	Bukit Timah			
Poi Ching School 培青学校	Mixed	Tampines			
Red Swastika School 卍慈学校	Mixed	Bedok			
Tao Nan School 道南学校	Mixed	Marine Parade	Affiliated to Singapore Hokkien Huay Kuan		Yes

=== SAP High Schools ===
Name	Type	School Code	Area	Notes	Website
Anglican High School 圣公会中学	Mixed	7101	Tanah Merah	Affiliated to: St Andrew's Junior College	
Catholic High School 公教中学	Boys	IP: 9131 Special: 7102	Bishan	Affiliated to: Eunoia Junior College (IP); Singapore Chinese Girls' School (IP); CHIJ Saint Nicholas Girls' School (IP); Catholic Junior College (Non-IP)	
CHIJ Saint Nicholas Girls' School 圣尼各拉女校	Girls	IP: 9134 Special: 7118	Ang Mo Kio	Affiliated to: Eunoia Junior College (IP), Singapore Chinese Girls' School (IP); Catholic High School (IP); Catholic Junior College (Non-IP); CHIJ St. Nicholas Girls' School (Primary)	
Chung Cheng High School (Main) 中正中学 (总校)	Mixed	7104	Marine Parade	Affiliated to: Nanyang Junior College (Non-IP); Chung Cheng High School (Yishun) (Non-IP)	
Dunman High School 德明政府中学	Mixed	3101	Tanjong Rhu		
Hwa Chong Institution 华侨中学	Boys	0806	Bukit Timah	Offers the Hwa Chong Diploma; Affiliated to: Nanyang Girls' High School (IP)	
Maris Stella High School 海星中学	Boys	7111	Toa Payoh	Affiliated to: Catholic Junior College (Non-IP); Maris Stella High School (Primary)	
Nan Chiau High School 南侨中学	Mixed	7112	Sengkang	Affiliated to Singapore Hokkien Huay Kuan	
Nan Hua High School 南华中学	Mixed	3047	Clementi		
Nanyang Girls' High School 南洋女子中学校	Girls	7114	Bukit Timah	Offers the Hwa Chong Diploma; Affiliated to: Hwa Chong Institution (IP); Nanyang Primary School	
River Valley High School 立化中学	Mixed	3103	Boon Lay		

== Admission ==
A student's admission to a SAP school (or any secondary school) is decided based on their results in the Primary School Leaving Examination (PSLE). To enter a SAP school, a student must achieve a PSLE aggregate score that puts him in the top 10% of his cohort, with an 'A' grade for both the Chinese and English (before AL).

This means that only a relatively small group of students who are academically and linguistically strong may enter a SAP school. Consequently, SAP schools have a reputation of being the "elite" group of secondary schools in the country, alongside independent and autonomous schools. This stems from the Singaporean tradition of effective bilingualism in the education of the elite students from SAP schools. Some students, regardless of whether they are in a SAP school, are offered a chance at effective trilingualism in secondary education starting from age 13. The first language, English, is the international language of commercial and the administrative and legal language of Singapore, a former British colony. The mother tongue reflecting the cultural and ethnic identity of the student. The "third languages" are foreign and Asian languages which are considered by MOE to be "economically, politically and culturally vital", such as Japanese, German, Spanish, French, Arabic, Bahasa Indonesia, Chinese (Special Programme) and Malay (Special Programme). In order to qualify for these programmes, a student must obtain a PSLE score of AL8 or better for foreign language, and AL24 for Asian Language.

== Historical context ==
Many SAP schools were historically Chinese language medium schools, i.e. they taught all academic subjects in Mandarin (including science and mathematics), and which may have taught English as a foreign language. Following Singapore's independence in 1965, the government recognised four official languages in Singapore (English, Mandarin Chinese, Malay and Tamil), but clearly designated English as the main language of basic and higher education, government and law, science and technology as well as trade and industry. This is reflected in the Bilingual Policy which came into effect in 1966. While according official recognition to the languages of different ethno-linguistic communities in Singapore, it sought to promote English as a neutral common language to unite a culturally diverse nation of immigrants. English was also held to be the language of international higher education, science/technology and commerce. As such, it was indispensable to Singapore, given her ambition to become a 'Global City', articulated as early as 1972.

As the English language gained importance, more parents inclined to send their child to English-medium schools, which adversely affected enrollment of Chinese-medium schools. In 1977, admission to Chinese-medium elementary schools made up only 10 per cent of the nation's cohort, which increasingly reflected the increasingly critical status of the Chinese-medium schools, in stark contrast over a decade. The need to preserve traditional Chinese schools with rich heritage and culture became a pressing agenda for the government, with raising English standards and attracting capable students into such schools a key priority, as pointed out by then Prime Minister Lee Kuan Yew.

In 1979, the Ministry of Education (MOE) designated nine Chinese-medium secondary schools as Special Assistance Plan (SAP) schools. These schools were intended to provide top-scoring primary school leavers with the opportunity to study both English and Mandarin to high levels of competence. Also, these schools were to preserve the character of traditional Chinese-medium secondary schools and allay fears that the Government was indifferent to Chinese language and culture amid declining enrolments in Chinese-medium schools. The selected schools were given additional teaching resources and given assistance to run classes with a lower student-to-teacher ratio.

The programme was deemed highly successful with five of the designated schools consistently attaining top ten positions in the secondary school ranking in the 1990s, outperforming several established English-medium schools. This supported the Government to further expand the programme to two other institutions with strong Chinese heritage, including Nan Chiau High School, which was initially listed as an SAP school candidate in 1978. Six top performing SAP high schools are also approved by the Ministry of Education to offer Integrated Programme (IP) to their full cohort, with The Chinese High School, Nanyang Girls' High School being the piloting schools with Hwa Chong Junior College in 2004, followed by River Valley High School in 2006 and Dunman High School in 2008. Catholic High School and CHIJ St. Nicholas Girls' School were approved to offer Joint Integrated Programme in 2013 with Singapore Chinese Girls' School.

== Societal significance ==
With rapid economic development and exposure to Western, particularly American popular culture and values in the 1970s and 1980s, Singapore began to change from a lower income, poorly educated society to a more confident, educated, vocal and individualistic society. Around the same time, in the 1980s, the world was witnessing the rise of Japan and the Asian newly-industrialised economies or NIEs, of which Singapore was one. Economically, America appeared unable to compete with rising Asian manufacturing competitors, especially Japan and was facing budget deficits. Singapore politicians from the dominant People's Action Party synthesised these various situations and developed certain ideas that came to be known as the Asian Values discourse.

According to this line of argument, Singapore, along with Taiwan, Hong Kong, South Korea and Japan, had succeeded so spectacularly in no small part because of their shared Confucianist cultural heritage, which emphasised values such as hard work, education, family unity, deference and loyalty to authority figures, community spirit (in contrast to Western individualism), etc.

To better sell this argument to a multi-ethnic population where the non-Chinese / non-'Confucianist' communities formed at least a quarter of the population, the discourse was re-branded 'Asian Values', rather than Confucian Work Ethic. In Singapore, traditional Asian culture was seen as a source of the nation's economic success thus far. As such, the government embarked on programmes and campaigns to promote traditional culture, including the revitalised Speak Mandarin Campaign (targeted at English rather than dialect speakers, as was historically the case) as well as SAP schools.

== Concerns and criticisms ==
The SAP school programme is periodically criticised in the national media by Singaporeans who are concerned about the ethnic segregation that it inevitably promotes. SAP schools offer mother tongue lessons in only one language: Mandarin. This means that the vast majority, if not all, of the students in SAP schools will be ethnically Chinese. These students will have little opportunities to interact with people of other races, which can potentially cause issues in a multi-racial country like Singapore. Besides, the SAP does not have Malay or Tamil equivalents, which might be viewed by some as MOE not placing these two languages on an equal level as Mandarin. In addition, subjects that are related to Chinese culture may also be taught in Mandarin, such as Chinese literature, the history of China and Chinese–English translation studies.
