= Judo at the 1973 SEAP Games =

The judo competition at the 1973 Southeast Asian Peninsular Games was held between 4 and 7 September at Chung Cheng High School.

== Medal summary ==
=== Men ===
Event	Gold	Silver	Bronze
Bantamweight	(Thailand) Montri Chomsakorn	(South Vietnam) Nguyen Xuan Khang	(Singapore) Low Chee Kiang
Lightweight	(Singapore) Tan Sin Aun	(Kingdom of Laos) Thao Ty	(Malaysia) M.T. Veloo
Light Middleweight	(Thailand) Somnuk Kitisathorn	(Kingdom of Laos) Bouakeo Daoleuang	(South Vietnam) Truong Duc Hieu
Middleweight	(Singapore) Wong Kin Jong	(Kingdom of Laos) Rattanamongkhoun Somkhit	(South Vietnam) Thach Cam Tong
Light Heavyweight	(Malaysia) Nordin Hamzah	(Singapore) Manmoham Singh	(Thailand) Kavi Lurogvirujkul
Heavyweight	(Singapore) Kan Kwok Toh	(Thailand) Vithaya Tarnpien	(Malaysia) Sarban Singh
Open	(Singapore) Choo Kah Wah	(Kingdom of Laos) Thao Sien	(Malaysia) Musa Yassin

== Medal table ==
Rank	Nation	Gold	Silver	Bronze	Total
1	Singapore (SIN)	4	1	1	6
2	Thailand (THA)	2	1	1	4
3	Malaysia (MAS)	1	0	3	4
4	Laos (LAO)	0	4	0	4
5	South Vietnam (VNM)	0	1	2	3
Totals (5 entries)		7	7	7	21
