= Dunman High School =

School in Kallang, Singapore

- 德明政府中学

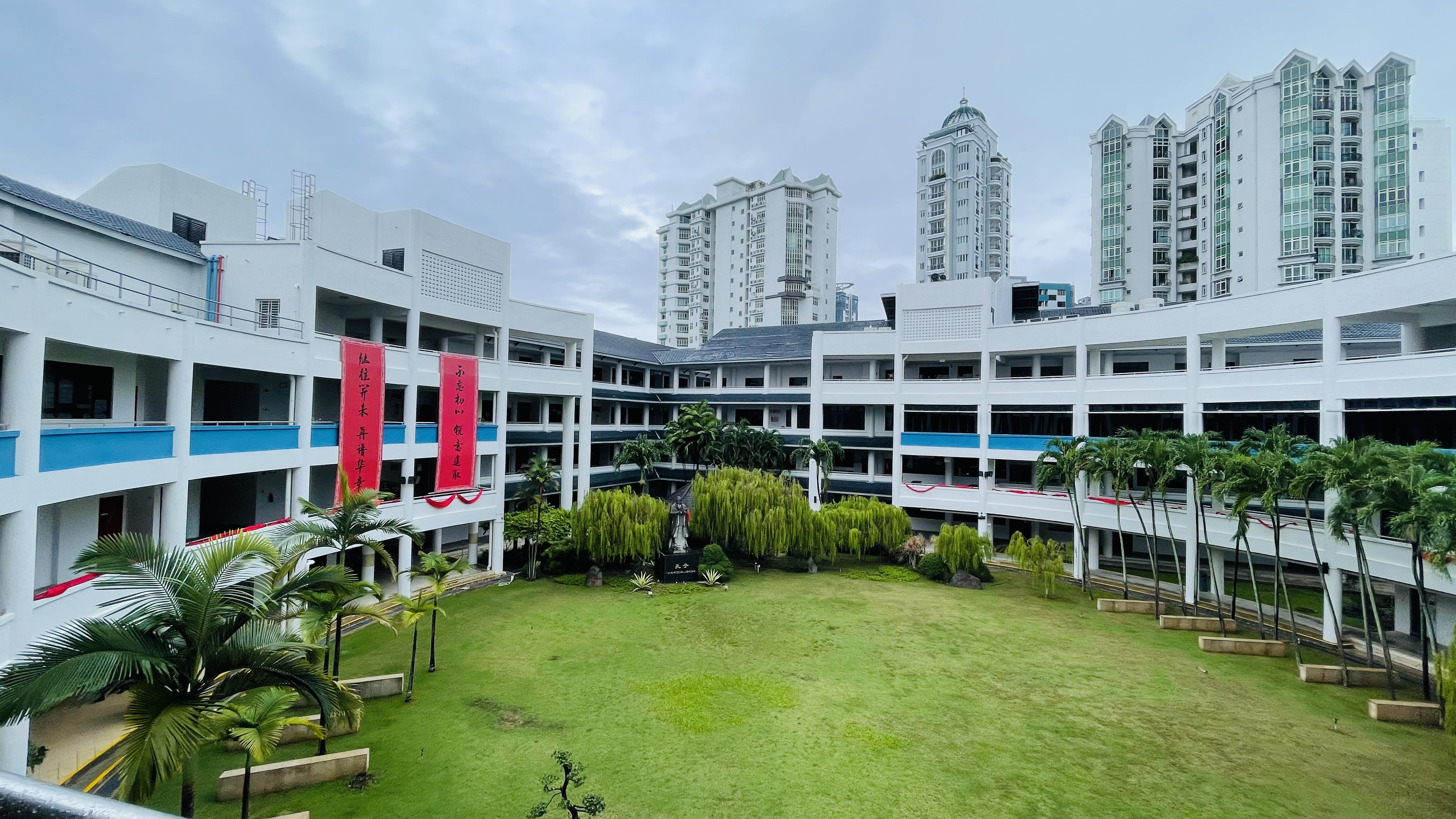

Location
- 10 Tanjong Rhu Road, Singapore 436895; 1°17′56″N 103°52′58″E

Information
- Type: Government-aided, Autonomous, Integrated Programme; Special Assistance Plan (SAP)
- Motto: 诚·信·勇·忠 (Honesty, Trustworthiness, Courage, Loyalty)
- Established: 14 October 1956; 69 years ago
- Session: Single
- School code: 3101
- Principal: Mr Chan Ying Yin
- Enrolment: approx. 2,400
- Colour: Red Blue White
- Website: dunmanhigh.moe.edu.sg

Dunman High School (DHS) is a co-educational government autonomous secondary school located in Kallang, Singapore, offering the Integrated Programme and the Special Assistance Plan (SAP). It was originally located in West Kallang.

Since adopting the Integrated Programme in 2007, it has produced three President's Scholars. It is also one of the largest government schools in Singapore by physical area.

== History ==
=== Kallang West Government Chinese Middle School ===
On 14 October 1956, during the Chinese middle school riots, the Ministry of Education established the predecessor of Dunman High School, Kallang West Government Chinese Middle School, along with other schools like River Valley High School and Hua Yi Secondary School. It was renamed Dunman High School after Thomas Dunman.

In the 1956 riots, Chinese middle-school students who subscribed to the communist ideology staged sit-ins and demonstrations, disrupted classes, and in effect shut their schools down. The function of the newly established Kallang West Government Chinese Middle School was to allow students who had no wish to be embroiled in communism to have a place to study. The premises of a newly built primary school at Mountbatten Road were loaned, and the initial enrolment included about 100 boys from The Chinese High School, with 10 teachers. In December 1957, the school moved to Dunman Road and was renamed "Dunman Government Chinese Middle School".

=== Designation of Special Assistance Plan ===
In 1979, the school was selected to be one of the nine Special Assistance Plan (SAP) secondary schools. It was renamed "Dunman High School" and began to offer both English and Chinese languages at the first-language level. When the Music Elective Programme (MEP) was introduced by the MOE in 1982, DHS was selected to implement the programme for musically gifted students.

In 1990, the school expanded by taking over the neighbouring former premises of Dunman Secondary School at Dunman Road. It then became a single-session school (previously the school was divided into the "morning session" and "afternoon session" so that two classes of students could share a classroom). It was one of six schools to go autonomous in 1994. The school moved to its current location in Tanjong Rhu on 27 May 1995. It was made the 7th Gifted Education Programme centre in Singapore in 1997.

=== 50th Anniversary ===
A time capsule was launched on the opening ceremony of DHS's 50th anniversary celebrations on 31 March 2006. It is meant to be opened in 2031, on the school's 75th anniversary. Items such as the DHS uniform and the 2006 student handbook were placed in it. A letter by the current principal of the school was also included. In addition, a Heritage Run was organised that day. There were also performances, including a dance by the school's Chinese Society, and a drumming performance by the percussionists from Chinese Orchestra and Symphonic Band. A 50th anniversary song, written by Kelvin Ang Chin Yuan, was played by Clara Ng Yi Wen and sung by the school.

=== Incorporation of Dunman High Programme ===
From 2005, the school offered implemented a customised version of the six-year Integrated Programme called the Dunman High Programme (DHP), which allows all students to bypass the O-Level examinations and directly take the A-Level examinations. To meet the needs of the Integrated Programme, the school moved to a holding school in the former Raffles Junior College campus at Mount Sinai in December 2006 to allow for upgrading of the current site at Tanjong Rhu.

The land area of the expanded campus increased from four hectares to seven hectares, making Dunman High School one of the biggest government-aided schools in Singapore. In December 2008 the classrooms, general office and staff rooms of the Tanjong Rhu campus were completed, and the school moved back to the Tanjong Rhu campus. On 2 January 2009 the school opened to a new year with an opening ceremony named "Homecoming" (回家) to welcome students and staff to the upgraded campus.

On 5 September 2017, Dunman High was featured in an episode of Channel 8's "When The Bell Rings" documentary series. This eight episode documentary series featured eight Special Assistance Plan (SAP) Schools in Singapore, and told stories of their transformation through the times. The episode on Dunman High was the last episode to be aired.

=== Joint Admissions Exercise ===
On 21 September 2018, the Ministry of Education announced that the final two remaining schools offering the IP - Dunman High School and River Valley High School - would be participating in the Joint Admissions Exercise in future. The following year in 2019, Dunman High School took in its first batch of O-level JAE students.

== School identity and culture ==
Dunman High School's Chinese name Démíng (德明) is a transliteration of "Dunman". The meaning of its name in Chinese is derived from a line in the Book of Rites (大学之道，在明明德) which is a statement that has influenced the Emperors of the Han, Tang and Song dynasties in Imperial China. It can be roughly translated as "the Dao (path) to the greatest learning lies in understanding the brightest virtues".

=== School crest ===
The school crest of Dunman High School was designed by Chen Jen Hao, its second principal, and Liu Kang, a pioneer in local fine art and former art teacher of the school. The two Chinese characters read, from right to left, "Dé míng", the Chinese name of the school. The characters are written in seal script.

The red colour symbolises passion and the drive for success. The blue colour signifies peace and dignity, while the circular border represents wholeness and unity, as well as the pursuit of universality, as defined in the Confucian classic Book of Rites.

=== School song ===
Dunman High School preserved its school song in Mandarin Chinese. The lyrics were originally written as prose by a chemistry teacher of the school in 1953.

=== Houses ===
Year 5 and 6 students of Dunman High School are sorted into 4 houses, namely:

1. Drakon, represented by the colour blue and the house mascot of a dragon.
2. Kirin, represented by the colour green and the house mascot of a pegasus.
3. Homa, represented by the colour orange and the house mascot of a griffin.
4. Bennu, represented by the colour red and the house mascot of a phoenix.

Together, the houses collectively form the portmanteau Drakihonnu, a moniker for the house system in Dunman High.

== Campus ==
Dunman High School is currently one of the largest government schools in Singapore in terms of physical area.

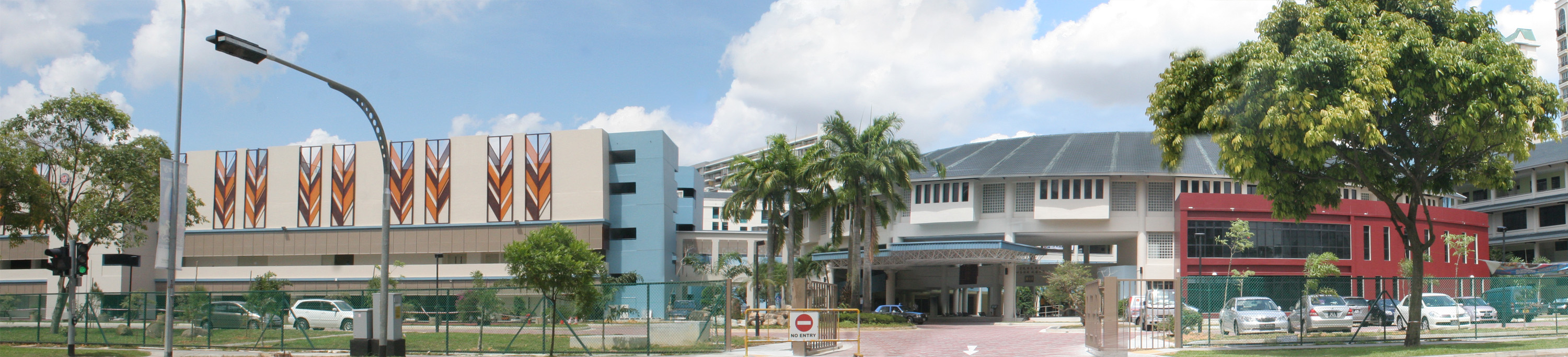
Dunman High School's upgraded campus along Tanjong Rhu Rd.

== Academic information ==
Incorporated within the six-year Dunman High Programme (DHP) are the Junior High (JH) and Senior High (SH) sections, which leads to the Singapore-Cambridge GCE Advanced Level examination. The school-wide Integrated Programme offered enables students to bypass the Singapore-Cambridge GCE Ordinary Level examination that is taken in the Special/Express course. Dunman High Junior High uses a Grade Point Average scoring system, with the following scoring system. As of 2019, the scoring system for Junior High students has been updated to include B+ and C+ grades.

Grade	Point
A+ (≥80%)	4.0
A (≥70%)	3.6
B+ (≥65%)	3.2
B (≥60%)	2.8
C+ (≥55%)	2.4
C (≥50%)	2.0
D (≥45%)	1.8
E (≥40%)	1.0
F (<40%)	0.0

DHS also organises academic competitions and conferences, both for its students and external participants. A variety of academic programmes, hosted by both the school as well as the Ministry of Education, are offered to students with the potential to excel.

== Co-curricular activities ==
Dunman High School offers Co-curricular Activities (CCAs), including competitive sports, uniformed groups, musical groups and clubs and societies. The school's traditional forte has been Chinese orchestral music. The Uniformed Groups have a strong presence in Dunman High School, with Saint John Ambulance Brigade, Scouts, Girl Guides and National Police Cadet Corps achieving honours.

== Relations with other schools ==
It is not officially affiliated with any other school. However, it holds an annual sports meet with Chung Cheng High School (Main), Ngee Ann Secondary School and Temasek Secondary School called the Four-School Combined Athletics Meet since 1980, in which students aged 13 to 16 from the four schools compete in Track & Field events. The original four schools were Dunman, Chung Cheng High School (Main), Chung Cheng High School (Branch) (now Chung Cheng High School (Yishun)) and Yuying Secondary School.

== Notable alumni ==
=== Politics ===
- Josephine Teo, Cabinet minister and Member of Parliament for Jalan Besar GRC
- Low Yen Ling, Senior Minister of State, Mayor of South West CDC and Member of Parliament for Bukit Gombak SMC
- Goh Pei Ming, Senior Minister of State for Home Affairs, and Social and Family development and Member of Parliament for Marine Parade-Braddell Heights GRC
- Poh Li San, Member of Parliament for Sembawang West SMC
- Alex Yam, Member of Parliament for Marsiling-Yew Tee GRC and Mayor of North West CDC
- Thomas Chua, former Nominated Member of Parliament, former President, Singapore Chamber of Commerce & Industry
- Douglas Foo, former Nominated Member of Parliament; founder, Sakae Holdings

=== Business ===
- Sam Goi, Executive Chairman, Tee Yih Jia

=== Sports ===
- Ng Ser Miang, former Vice President, International Olympic Committee; founder, Trans-Island Bus Services

=== Arts ===
- Vincy Chan, Hong Kong singer and artiste
- Michelle Chong, actress, comedienne, host and businesswoman
- Curley G, Chinese singer-songwriter and member of BonBon Girls 303
- Kuo Pao Kun, playwright, theatre director and arts activist
- Kirsten Tan, film director and screenwriter

== See also ==
- Education in Singapore
