= Chung Cheng High School (Main) =

Government-aided school in Singapore

- 中正中学 (总校) (Chinese); Sekolah Tinggi Chung Cheng (Utama) (Malay) சங் செங் உயா் பள்ளி (Tamil)

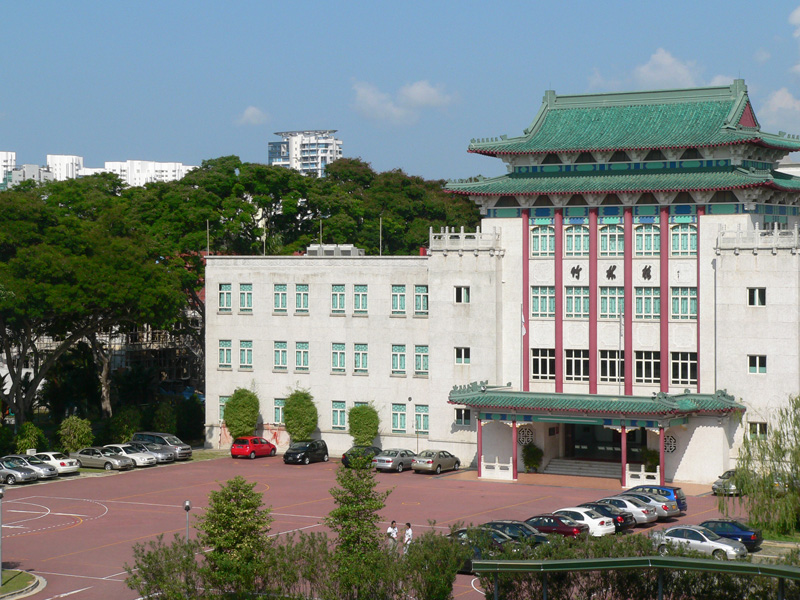

Location
- 50 Goodman Road, Singapore 439012; 1.3055°N 103.8916°E

Information
- Former name: Chiang Kai-shek High School (The English name of the school was changed due to protests from Chiang Kai-shek's government, but the Chinese name has remained unchanged.)
- Type: Government-aided; Autonomous; Special Assistance Plan
- Established: 1939; 87 years ago
- School code: 7104
- Principal: Terence Yao Zhixuan
- Enrolment: 1500
- Colour: Red White
- Affiliation: Nanyang Junior College; Chung Cheng High School (Yishun)
- Website: www.chungchenghighmain.moe.edu.sg

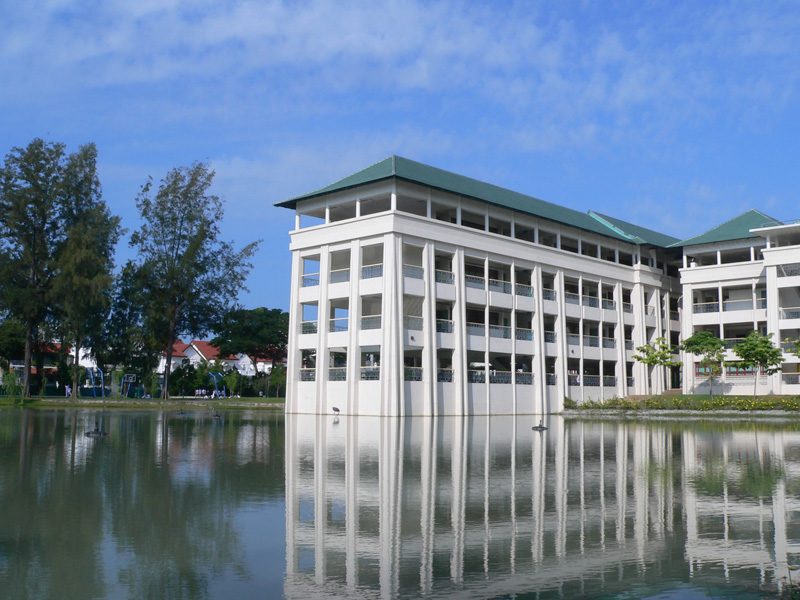
One of the classroom buildings of CCHMS, 琢璞楼, extending into the Chung Cheng Lake

Chung Cheng High School (Main) is a co-educational government-aided autonomous Special Assistance Plan (SAP) secondary school in Singapore. Founded in 1939 as Chiang Kai-shek High School, it is one of the eleven SAP secondary schools in Singapore. Another Secondary School in Singapore, Chung Cheng High School (Yishun), is its sister school.

== History ==
=== Foundation years (1939–1947) ===
Chung Cheng High School was first founded by Aw Boon Haw and other philanthropists. Construction of the school building started at 60 Kim Yam Road in 1939. The founding principal of the school was Chuang Chu Lin and the school's first school supervisor was Lim Bo Seng. Aw Boon Haw was the founding chairman of the school management board. The school started off as an all-boys' school.

Some of the founders were politically affiliated with Kuomintang and decided to name the school Chung Cheng after Chiang Chung-cheng, Premier of the Republic of China, to attract students and boost the school's reputation. The naming of the school was approved by Chiang. Chuang, wished to run the school without any political influence and frequently disobeyed instructions from Kuomintang affiliated staff, leading to conflicts between the Kuomintang affiliated and non-affiliated board members and staff.

In 1940, the Kuomintang affiliated staff reported the situation to the Chinese government and wished for instructions to close down the school. The Chinese government acceded to the request and requested the school board to close down the school. Chuang called a school assembly and during the assembly, a teacher, Li Rou Chen, pointed out that the name Chung Cheng is not exclusive to Chiang Chung-cheng and had other meanings as well. Li also suggested the school to stop associating with Chiang and to run the school neutrally. In the same year, the school disassociated with Chiang and the Kuomintang.

In 1940, Xie Rongxi took over as chairman of the management board. Students came from as far as Thailand and the Philippines. Following the Japanese occupation of Singapore in 1942, the school was forced to stop classes.

After the war, classes resumed and the school started enrolling female students. To support youths whose education was disrupted by war, the school started accepting students whose ages were older than the average. Xie Rongxi was re-appointed as chairman of the management committee and Chuang Chu Lin was re-appointed the principal. The school achieved top honours among Singapore schools in the first national examination after the war.

=== Establishment of branch school ===
In 1947, the School Management Board, headed by Lin Shi Wan, acquired a piece of land at Goodman Road for a new premise to cope the increasing student population. Back in its early days, the premise held up to 2,400 students. The new institution premise was named Chung Cheng High School (Main) while the premise at Kim Yam.

In 1968, the Administration Building (Zhulin Building) was completed along with the entrance arch. It was officially declared open by Prime Minister Lee Kuan Yew on 21 July 1968. The building incorporated proper educational facilities such as a library, laboratories, and the largest auditorium in Singapore of the time, with a seating capacity of over 2,000.

In May 1969, the School Management Committee of Chung Cheng High School and The Singapore Hokkien Huay Kuan agreed on an exchange of campus land of Chung Cheng High School (Branch) with a newly built Kong Hwa Wing building adjacent to Kong Hwa School. As such, Chung Cheng High School (Branch) was relocated to 339 Guillemard Road, while the original premises at 60 Kim Yam Rd became part of the extension for the campus of Nan Chiau Girls' High School.

The school's auditorium was completed in 1968 and the Science and Technology Block was completed and declared open on 20 April 1975. In 1979, Chung Cheng High School (Main) became one of the nine schools piloting the Special Assistance Plan. Under this scheme, the school offers both the English and Chinese languages as first languages to Special Stream students.

However, Chung Cheng High School was accused in the education sector in the 1980s for improving its standards through exploiting its status, by drawing potential students from schools that were not selected as Special stream schools.

=== Attainment of autonomous status ===
Work on the building of the Gewu Building, which is also known as the Craft & Technical Complex began in 1990, and was completed by 1992.

The school achieved autonomous status in 1996 in recognition of consistent value-added academic performance.

The third phase of the school development ended in 1999. To complement the 32 classroom block which had been completed in 1995, a 320-seat lecture theatre was added together with other facilities such as computer laboratories, a media resource library, science laboratories, a music room, complete with learning hardware and software, with other special rooms.

=== Establishment of Centre of Excellence ===
In 2001, the school embarked on a project to develop a heritage gallery that would be open to anyone interested in Singapore's history. In July 2003, the school's heritage gallery was opened by Chan Soo Sen, Minister of State for Education. It has historical artefacts, photographs and IT presentations. In 2003 the school's programmes and processes were acknowledged when it was presented with the Singapore Quality Circle Award for its great contribution to education.

In May 2004, the school was the first to put on a full performance at the theatre in the Esplanade. The school launched a four-year Chinese Studies Programme (CSP) in January 2005 to provide pupils with opportunities to increase their exposure to Chinese culture and to help them develop a deeper appreciation for it. In April 2005, CCHMS was selected to serve as the Centre of Excellence for Chinese in the East Zone (COE), and was awarded the coveted 'School Distinction Award' in recognition of the processes that the school has put in place that lead to sustained achievements in students outcome. In the same year, the school made the new Guinness World Record for the longest can-chain was achieved. This project was undertaken to increase environmental awareness and to raise funds for the needy.

In 2006, the new building for the Centre of Excellence (COE) for Chinese Language and Culture, named the Innosphere, was opened. It has facilities such as a library for Chinese language resources, a teahouse and an auditorium. It serves as a venue for seminars, workshops, exhibitions and performances. The Centre houses all the aesthetics CCAs under one roof, in conjunction with the plan to develop the school's niche areas in the aesthetics programmes. To promoting a deeper understanding of Chinese culture, the school is involved in a twinning programme with schools in China.

=== Present ===
In 2010, the school was awarded the School Excellence Award (SEA) and Best Practice Award (Student All-Round Development). SEA is an award recognising all-round excellence under the MOE's Master-plan of Awards.

On 20 July 2013, the school celebrated its 74th anniversary at Chung Cheng High School (Main). On the same day, the school also launched a mobile app for students to learn more about the school's history. The Guest of Honour, Education Minister Heng Swee Keat, launched the mobile app as well as officiated the opening of the schools new buildings, Hao Ran Building, housing a newly renovated multi-purpose hall and canteen and Na Yun Building, containing the school's indoor sports hall. These buildings were completed under the Programme for Rebuilding and Improving Existing Schools project. Other improved facilities include covered walkways. The recent phase of upgrading cost around S$70 million, and saw the renovation of several buildings, such as the Administration Building. The new extension is built on a portion of the lake, with part of the building extending into the lake.

In 2014, the school celebrated its 75th anniversary. At the anniversary gala on 10 July 2014, the Guest of Honour, Prime Minister Lee Hsien Loong, announced that the Administration Building and the Entrance Arch of the school have now been gazetted as a combined national monument. It was Singapore's 66th national monument. Prime Minister Lee also opened the Lim Tze Peng art gallery, which is located in the school. Lim is an alumnus of the school and he contributed some 100 artworks to the school.

== Identity and culture ==
=== Name ===
Chung Cheng High School was named after Chiang Kai-shek, Premier of the Republic of China, to attract students and boost the school's reputation.

=== Uniform and attire ===
Chung Cheng High (Main)'s uniform consists of a white studded shirt with eight-pleated skirts for female students, shorts for male students in lower secondary levels, or long pants for boys in upper secondary levels. The studded shirt features two chest pockets and seven metal buttons in total, two the shoulders, two on each pocket and three down the front, a distinct feature of its heritage as a former Chinese middle school. The school badge and a red name tag is worn with the uniform, with the exception of councillors which features distinct badges. A red school tie is worn during important school functions.

== Affiliations ==
Chung Cheng High School (Main) is affiliated with its former branch school, Chung Cheng High School (Yishun), located at Yishun Street 61. Both schools are affiliated to Nanyang Junior College, located at Serangoon Avenue 3.

== Campus ==
Chung Cheng High School (Main) is renowned for its lake, known as the Zhongzheng Lake. The administration building (Zhulin Building), a gazetted national monument on 10 July 2014, has the auditorium which was the largest in the whole Southeast Asia region when it was opened. The building was designed by Ho Beng Heng, an alumnus of the school. Constructed using reinforced concrete, the building features a modern functional layout displaying Chinese architectural identities such as the prominent double-tier roof with glazed Chinese tiles, and cloud and bat motifs.

The Entrance Arch of the school, also a gazetted national monument, features stylised motifs of bats, which represent good fortune and happiness. Ornamented stone pedestals clad the base of the posts, which are believed to resemble calligraphy brushes.

== Relationship with other schools ==
CCHMS annually holds a Four-School Combined Sports Meet with Dunman High School, Temasek Secondary School and Ngee Ann Secondary School in which students aged 13 to 16 from the four schools compete in sports events. The meet began in the 1980s, but the original configuration of the four schools where Dunman High School, Chung Cheng High (Main), Chung Cheng High (Branch) and Yock Eng High School. In the early days, these schools were situated near one another, and the meet was held at the old National Stadium.

== Notable alumni ==
- Lee Chiaw Meng, former Singapore Cabinet Minister, Minister of Education (1972-1975), Minister of Science & Technology (1975-1976), PAP Member of Parliament for Farrer Park (1964-1980), Tanah Merah (1980-1984)
- Tay Teow Kiat, Music Director of Nanyang Academy of Fine Arts, founding father of Chinese Orchestra music in S'pore, Cultural Medallion 1993 winner, awarded Meritorious Service Medal (Pingat Jasa Gemilang) 2017
- Lim Tze Peng, famous artist (Chinese calligraphy) and Cultural Medallion 2003 winner, awarded Meritorious Service Medal (Pingat Jasa Gemilang) 2016
- Liu Thai Ker, Principal architect and former Master Planner of the Urban Redevelopment Authority, awarded Meritorious Service Medal (Pingat Jasa Gemilang) 1985
- Low Thia Khiang, former Member of Parliament for Aljunied GRC and Secretary-General of the Workers' Party
- Wee Cho Yaw, philanthropist, former chairman of United Overseas Bank and chairman of UOL Group, awarded Distinguished Service Order (Darjah Utama Bakti Cemerlang), 2011
- Zhu Houren, Mediacorp veteran actor
- Evelyn Tan, Mediacorp actress
- Boo Junfeng, Singaporean filmmaker
