= Tan Lark Sye =

Singaporean businessman (1897–1972)

- 陈六使
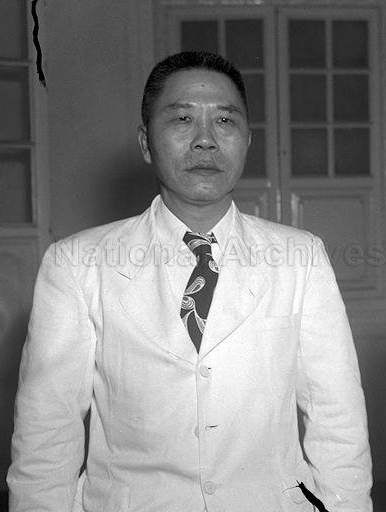
- Tan in 1950
- Born: 7 June 1897; Jimei, Tong'an County, Fujian Province, Qing Empire
- Died: 11 September 1972 (aged 75); Singapore
- Resting place: Bukit Brown Municipal Cemetery (former); Beeh Low See Buddhist Temple, Bukit Timah (current)
- Known for: Founder of Nanyang University; Chairman of the Singapore Hokkien Huay Kuan; Chairman of the Singapore Chinese Chamber of Commerce
- Relatives: Tan Eng Joo; Tan Kah Kee (distant relative)

Tan Lark Sye
- Traditional Chinese: 陳六使
- Simplified Chinese: 陈六使
Transcriptions
Standard Mandarin
- Hanyu Pinyin: Chén Liùshǐ
Southern Min
- Hokkien POJ: Tân La̍k-sài

Tan Lark Sye (simplified Chinese: 陈六使; traditional Chinese: 陳六使; pinyin: Chén Liùshǐ; Pe̍h-ōe-jī: Tân La̍k-sài; 7 June 1897 – 11 September 1972) was a prominent Chinese businessman and philanthropist based in Singapore.

== Early life ==
Tan was born in a Hoklo peasant family of seven in Jimei of Tong An in Fujian, China. Born into of very limited means, and orphaned young, he had little chance of an education before he made his way to Nanyang in 1916 together with his brothers, at the age of 18.

== Career ==
In Singapore, Tan worked in one of Tan Kah Kee's factories, and within half a year he was promoted to a responsible position in Tan Kah Kee's Khiam Aik (Qianyi) company. Not long afterward, he left the company to set up a rubber enterprise with the help from his brothers, but the enterprise lost half its capital in a year.

Tan then ran it alone and after several years, he built up his Aik Hoe (Yihe) rubber company and became one of the leading rubber industrialists of the region. He expanded his business to all parts of Malaya, Thailand and India and diversified into insurance, paper and cement industries. His career as an industrialist peaked in the 1950s, when his company reaped huge profits from the rising price of rubber.

== Later life ==
Tan was stripped of his Malayan citizenship in Singapore in 1963 by the Malaysian Federal Government as a suspected communist, and remained stateless since then. Tan died in 1972 in Singapore at the age of 76, leaving behind 11 sons and 3 daughters.

== Contributions and legacy ==
Tan was an activist, and like other entrepreneurs of his time, he believed in the value of education. As chairman of the Chinese Chamber of Commerce in the 1950s, he fought for citizenship for Chinese people in Singapore and for the Chinese language to be one of Singapore's official languages.

As the long-time president of the Singapore Hokkien Huay Kuan, Tan Lark Sye contributed generously to charitable and educational causes throughout his life. He provided strong support for educational institutions under the auspices of the association, including Kong Hwa School, Tao Nan School, Nan Chiau Girls' High School, and Chongfu School. He also contributed to financing the institutions in Jimei founded by Tan Kah Kee.

In 1957 he donated considerable sums to Thailand's Hokkien clan association to build overseas Chinese schools. His contributions to education, however, were not confined to Chinese schools. In 1949, when the University of Malaya was set up, Tan donated S$300,000, and between 1950 and 1960 he contributed to the building of schools of different language mediums.

Tan's most outstanding contribution, however, was the initiating of the founding of Nanyang University in 1953. He visited Kuala Lumpur to raise funds, where he was welcomed by fellow philanthropist, Cheong Yoke Choy, who also contributed to the fund raising. He donated S$5 million to its building fund, as well as 523 acres (2.12 km^{2}) of land for its campus on behalf of the Hokkien Huay Kuan. Between 1953 and 1963, he was Chairman of Nanyang University's Executive Committee, and was in charge of various aspects of the university by building, teaching staff, research facilities, library, student welfare and others. Nanyang University was later merged with The University of Singapore in 1980 to form the current National University of Singapore.

The establishment of Nanyang University had a lasting influence on Chinese education in the region and beyond. It pioneered the establishment of Chinese Studies departments in Ngee Ann College, the University of Singapore and the University of Malaya. The establishment of the Chinese University of Hong Kong, and the Southern University College in Johor, Malaysia, were also inspired by the ideals underlying the founding of Nanyang University.

In 1974, a Tan Lark Sye scholarship was set up, and in 1998 the Tan Lark Sye professorship in Chinese language and culture was established to honour Tan.

== Honours ==
Tan Lark Sye Library, New Era University College, Malaysia was named after him.

On 19 October 2019, two parts of Nanyang Technological University (NTU) were re-named in honour of the pioneering contributions made by Tan Lark Sye and the Hokkien Huay Kuan to Singapore's education. Nanyang Valley, a road in front of the Chinese Heritage Centre, was renamed the “Tan Lark Sye Walk”. In tandem, the College of Humanities, Arts and Social Sciences building was renamed the “Singapore Hokkien Huay Kuan Building”.
