= Chung Cheng High School (Yishun) =

- 中正中学 (义顺); Sekolah Tinggi Chung Cheng Yishun

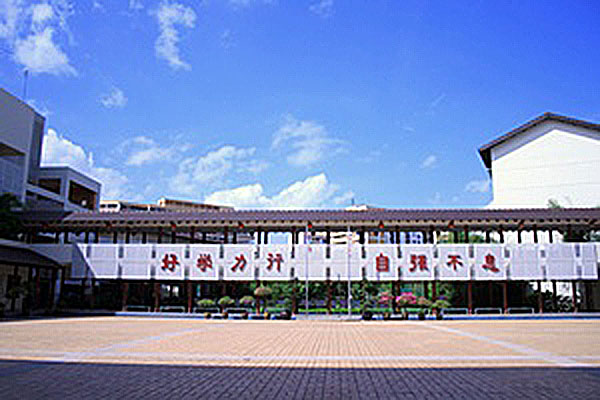

Location
- 11 Yishun Street 61, Singapore 768547; Yishun, Singapore
- 1.418737°N 103.837311°E

Information
- Type: Government Aided co-educational
- Motto: 好学力行 (Success through Diligence & Perseverance, knowledge and Faith)
- Established: August 1947; 78 years ago
- Session: Single
- School code: 7105
- Principal: Chia Guo Hao (Mr)
- Enrolment: 1300+
- Colour: Red White
- Affiliation: Chung Cheng High School; Nanyang Junior College
- Website: chungchenghighyishun.moe.edu.sg

Chung Cheng High School (Yishun) (CCHY) is a co-educational government-aided secondary school in Yishun, Singapore. It is an affiliated school and a former branch school of Chung Cheng High School (Main).

== History ==
With the start of enrolment of female students by Chung Cheng High School in 1947, student population increased significantly throughout the post war years, and the initial premise of the school at River Valley became increasingly overcrowded. In August 1947, Lin Shi Wan, Chairman of the Management Board, set up a new campus on a plot of land at Goodman Road, naming the campus Chung Cheng High School (Main) while the original school at Kim Yam Road functioned as a branch school, renamed as Chung Cheng High School (Branch).

In May 1969, the School Management Committee of Chung Cheng High School and The Singapore Hokkien Huay Kuan agreed on an exchange of campus land of Chung Cheng High School (Branch) with a newly built Kong Hwa Wing building adjacent to Kong Hwa School. Chung Cheng High (Branch) was relocated to 339 Guillemard Road, while the original premises at 60 Kim Yam Road becoming part of the extension for the campus of Nan Chiau Girls' High School. In 1981, following unification of language streams by the Ministry of education, the school began to convert to English stream classes. In the late 1980s, there was an urgent need to upgrade the school facilities and to move to a spacious location. As rebuilding the school on the current 0.6 hectare land was not feasible, the school opted for relocation to a more spacious better-equipped facility.

Between January 2002 and 2005, the school operated at two campuses, the Guillemard site and the holding school at Sembawang Drive. Chung Cheng High School (Branch) was renamed as Chung Cheng High School (Yishun) with effect from January 2006.

== Principal ==
Name of Principal	Years served
Chuang Chu Lin	1939–1957
Ko Pei Teck	1957–1960
Kok Chong Peng	1960–1970
Chuang Wei Lang	1970–1978
Chua Hun Cheong	1979–1994
Ong Kian Choon	1994–1999
Yap Juye Long	1999–2006
Ong Kock Hua	2007–2012
Yap Thiam Chuan	2013–2018
Tan Yee Kan	2019–2021
Chia Guo Hao	2021 (Incumbent)

== Affiliations ==
Chung Cheng High School (Yishun) is an affiliated school and a former branch school of Chung Cheng High School (Main). Both schools are affiliated to Nanyang Junior College.

== Co-curricular activities ==
Chung Cheng High School (Yishun) offers 20 Co-Curricular Activities (or CCA). Every student in Chung Cheng High School (Yishun) is expected to participate in a CCA from one of the four domains, namely: Clubs & Societies, Physical Sports, Uniformed Groups and Visual & Performing Arts.

== Gallery ==
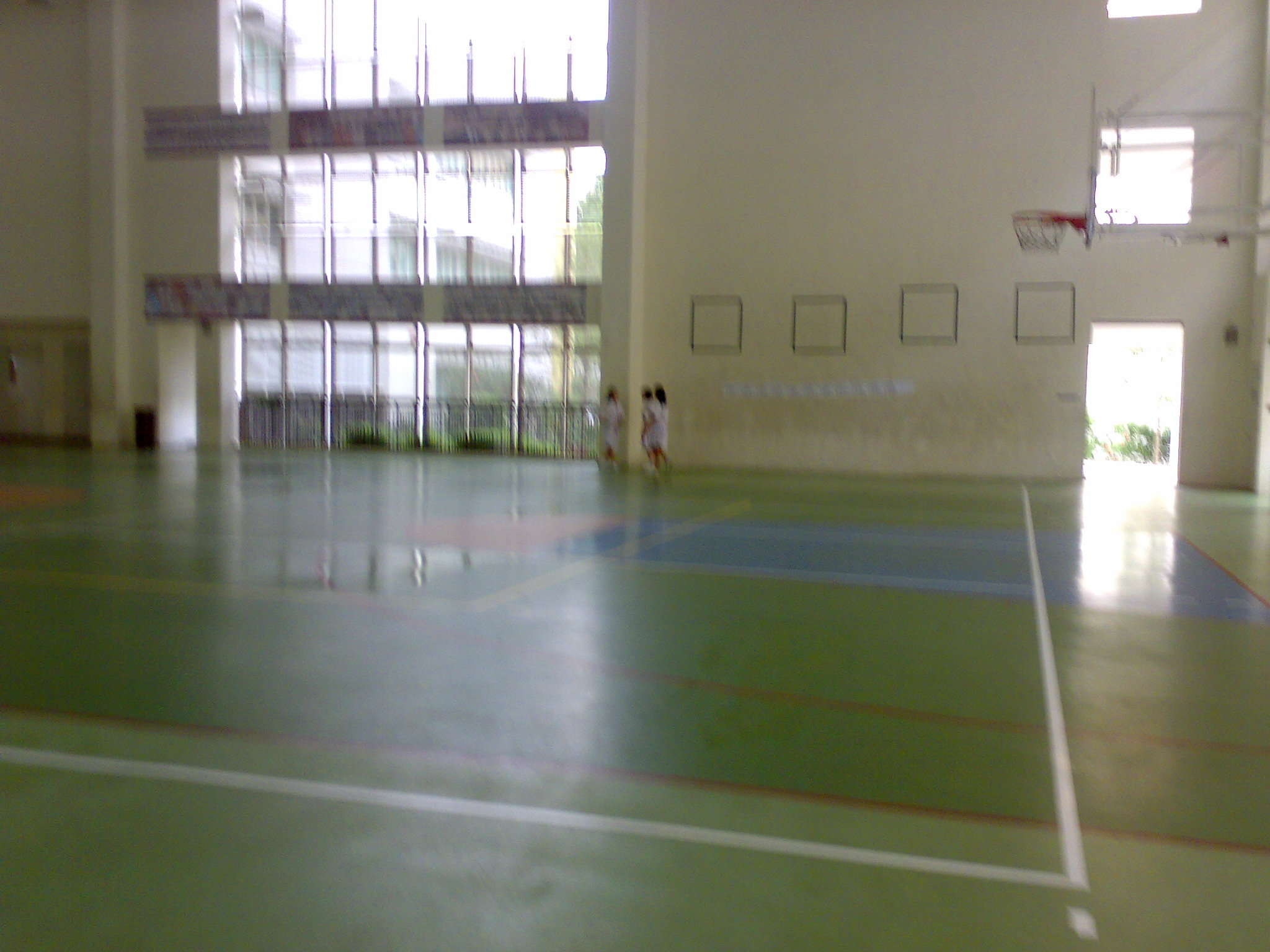
Sports Hall of Chung Cheng High School (Yishun).

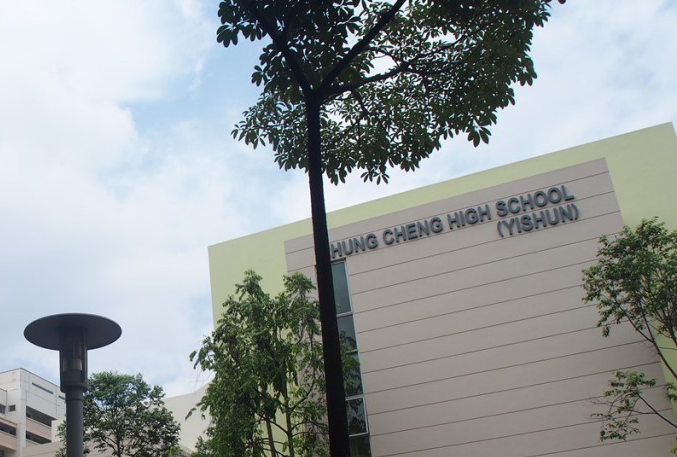
Roadside view of Chung Cheng High School (Yishun).
