= River Valley High School =

- 立化中学; Sekolah Tinggi River Valley

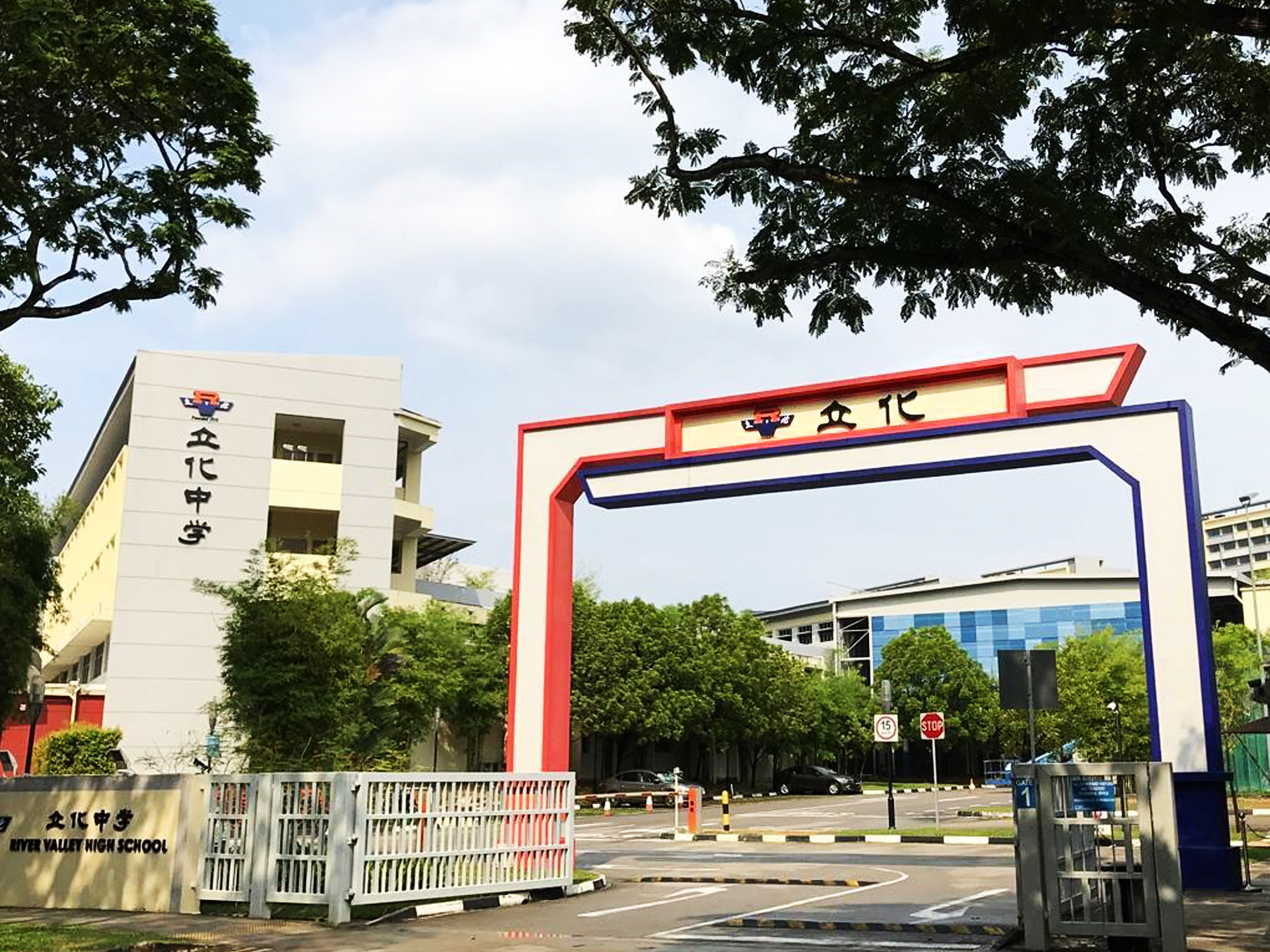

Location
- 6 Boon Lay Avenue; 649961; 1.343172°N 103.709490°E

Information
- Type: Government-aided; Autonomous; Special Assistance Plan (SAP); Integrated Programme (IP)
- Motto: 立德立功 化愚化顽 (We shall uphold virtues and contribute to society. Through personal growth, we shall guide others in the quest for knowledge and wisdom.)
- Established: 16 January 1956; 70 years ago
- Session: Single session
- School code: 3103
- Principal: Choy Wai Yin
- Colour: Red Blue White
- Team name: Team RV
- Publication: "RV Times"
- Website: www.rvhs.moe.edu.sg

River Valley High School (RVHS) is a co-educational government autonomous secondary school in Boon Lay, Singapore. Founded on 16 January 1956 and originally located in Tiong Bahru and subsequently River Valley, it is one of the Special Assistance Plan schools designated by the Ministry of Education in recognition of its heritage and excellence in education. Since 2006, the school has been running a six-year Integrated Programme that allows students to skip the Singapore-Cambridge GCE Ordinary Level examinations and proceed to sit for the Singapore-Cambridge GCE Advanced Level examinations at the end of Year 6.

== History ==
RVHS was founded as the Singapore Chinese Middle School in 1956. It was the first Chinese middle school set up by the government and it occupied the premises of Seng Poh Primary School. It was later renamed Queenstown Government Chinese Middle School and subsequently River Valley Government Chinese Middle School when it moved to Strathmore Avenue.

RVHS admitted its first batch of English-stream pupils in 1979 when it was selected as one of the nine pioneering Special Assistance Plan (SAP) schools in that same year. It was a difficult time for the school, as Madam Leong Fun Chin who was the principal from 1974-1993 recalled. However, despite all the hardships, she led RVHS through its transition into a premier Chinese-medium school and later a top SAP school. She was known for her nurturing, gentle, yet firm leadership style, often described as a "motherly" figure to students.

RVHS moved from its River Valley campus to a new campus at West Coast in December 1986. Due to the smaller school campus at the West Coast site, the school became a double-session school. It reverted to a single-session school in 1993 after new blocks were constructed. It was among the first six schools in Singapore to become autonomous in 1994. For its achievements in its CCAs, it was also one of the first schools to receive all three available Sustained Achievement Awards when it was first offered by the Ministry of Education in 2001.

In 2006, RVHS started running a six-year Integrated Programme which allows students to skip the Singapore-Cambridge GCE Ordinary Level examinations, which students in Singapore normally take at the end of Secondary Four, and proceed to sit for the Singapore-Cambridge GCE Advanced Level at the end of the sixth year. The final batch of GCE Ordinary Level students graduated from RVHS in 2007. In June 2006, RVHS moved out of its first holding site at Queensway to a second holding site at Malan Road. The Malan Road campus housed the school while they were waiting for the new school building to be ready in 2009.

At a press release held by the Ministry of Education on 21 September 2018, it was revealed that RVHS would be participating in the Joint Admission Exercise as of 2019, and will accept GCE Ordinary Level graduates from other secondary schools for Years 5 and 6 of its Integrated Programme. Under this exercise, the first batch of students from other secondary schools were admitted into RVHS in February 2019.

The school was the scene of a killing of a Secondary 1 student by a Secondary 4 schoolmate in July 2021, which made domestic and international headlines.

== School identity and culture ==
RVHS is known for its inclusive and conservative culture, a common trait shared among Special Assistance Plan schools with Chinese backgrounds.

=== School song ===
RVHS retains its school song in Chinese. The song, with close links to the school motto, represents the heritage of the school and the aspirations of the founders' hopes in educating the next generation. Students are reminded to bring glory to the school through excellence in both academics and behaviour. The school song is written in literary Chinese, giving it a poetic touch. The lyrics are written in verses of four characters, a parallel to Chinese idioms, with the exception of the last two verses.

=== Crest ===
RVHS's crest is made of the school initials "RV", with the letter "R" in red colour and "V" in blue colour. The colour of red symbolises radiance, progress and vitality, the colour of blue symbolises steadfastness, graciousness and serenity, while white symbolises purity and receptiveness to innovation.

=== Uniform ===
==== Formal attire ====
	Junior High (i.e. Years 1 to 3)	Senior High (i.e. Years 4 to 6)
Boys	Boys wear a short-sleeved, white shirt (with metal buttons) and white shorts. The shirt is to be tucked out.	Boys wear a white, short-sleeved, collared dress shirt and white trousers. The shirt is to be tucked in and a belt is optional.
Girls	Girls wear a short-sleeved white dress (with metal buttons). The waist is tightened with a white cloth belt.	Girls wear a white, short-sleeved, collared blouse and a blue knee-length skirt. The blouse is to be tucked in.
Remarks	Both uniforms have white epaulettes, secured with metal buttons. Both also bear the school's initials "RV" (with the "R" in red and "V" in blue) on the left breast for girls and left breast pocket for boys. Metal buttons are inscribed with the characters "立化" (pinyin: lìhuà).	A collar pin bearing the school crest is worn on the left collar for both uniforms. Additional collar pins may be worn to indicate the student's involvement in certain school activities. Student councillors wear a dark blue necktie. For some ceremonial occasions, a red blazer and blue necktie are worn over the uniform with a pair of dress shoes.

==== Physical Education attire ====
Both genders wear a T-shirt and dark blue shorts comprising synthetic materials for PE. The T-shirt is predominantly white, with red and blue accents. Older T-shirts had a zipper and displayed the characters "立化" (pinyin: lìhuà) on the left breast. Newer T-shirts have greater red colouration, lack a zipper, and instead bear the school's crest on the left breast. The PE attire is not to be worn to any ceremonial occasion or to non-physical activities (e.g. flag-raising).

==== Other attire ====
For all students, a school-based polo T-shirt (which is similar to the PE T-shirt, just with the collar) is to be worn with the formal attire's trousers, shorts or skirt as appropriate. On certain days, the formal attire's trousers, shorts or shirt may be worn with other T-shirts (e.g. shirts from one's CCA or orientation course).

=== Song writing heritage ===
RVHS is known for its popularity in composing and singing campus songs and xinyao, a genre of Singaporean Chinese songs originating in the 1980s. RVHS also has its collection of songs written by its former and present students. This associates RVHS with institutions that have strong cultural backgrounds and influence in Singapore's music scene, such as Hwa Chong Institution and Jurong Junior College. RVHS graduates are also seen taking an active role in the continuation of Singapore's song-writing heritage.

In recent years, younger alumni has taken up the mantra of writing xinyao songs like 立化情, written by Miss Nicholine Neo, of the 2013 graduating class which is now the official graduation song sung at every graduation class ceremony. Others include 立化美女, a cheeky song about dating in the school.

== Campus ==
Bird-eye view of River Valley High School Campus

River Valley High School has shifted her campus six times in total, more than any other schools in Singapore.

When the school was founded in 1956, it initially occupied the premises of Seng Poh Primary School on Seng Poh Road as its first campus location.

RVHS's campus is the newest among all Special Assistance Plan and Integrated Programme schools. It was officially declared open in 2010 and cost over S$70 million in construction. Located off Boon Lay Avenue at the former sites of ITE Jurong and Boon Lay Garden Primary School, the 7.64-hectare campus comprises facilities that supports the educational needs for the six-year Integrated Programme, and strongly encapsulate a strong cultured environment.

=== River Valley High Student Hostel ===
The RVHS Student Hostel is located adjacent to the school campus, consisting of two 12-storey buildings and one 15-storey building (Halls 1, 2 & 3 respectively). It provides accommodation for up to 500 boarders and 25 teacher mentors. The building features a dining hall and is supported with internet access. However, this hostel closed in late 2016. As of 2019, the hostel is now privately operated by 85soho, a hostel operator.

== Academic information ==
RVHS, being a Special Assistance Plan school, is strongly influenced by Chinese culture. Chinese language, culture and history are often emphasised in the school. It is compulsory for students from Years 1 to 4 to take Higher Chinese as a subject. Chinese culture lessons are also mandatory in lower secondary and students can opt for Chinese Literature in upper secondary. It also offers the Bicultural Studies Programme (Chinese) also offered in other schools such as Dunman High School, Hwa Chong Institution and Nanyang Girls' High School. The programme aims to nurture independent and passionate individuals who uphold strong moral character, effectively bilingual in English and Chinese, and have a global perspective that allows them to face challenges in the changing world. River Valley High School's Bicultural Studies Program (BSP) includes camps, enrichment electives which complements the ministry's programme.

Starting in 2006, RVHS has been offering the six-year Integrated Programme, allowing its students to take the Singapore-Cambridge GCE Advanced Level examinations at the end of the sixth year. River Valley High School has been ranked as one of the top schools in Singapore consistently throughout her history, producing many scholars including President's Scholars. One of the President's Scholar is Madam Chang Hwee Nee, the current Chief Executive Officer of the National Heritage Board. She is also the wife of the current Deputy Prime Minister of Singapore, Mr Heng Swee Keat.

== Alumni ==
The River Valley High School Alumni Association (RVHSAA) was established on 1 November 1979 by Harold Soh Eng Meng and his school mates with the vision of connecting RVians from different backgrounds and different batches. The RVHSAA is currently helmed by Raymond Tan, from the graduating class of 1996.

In October 2024, the RVHSAA celebrated her 45th anniversary, after missing the 40th anniversary celebration due to COVID-19. Throughout the years, the RVHSAA has been instrumental in hosting various events in conjunction with the school. Despite RVHS having to move campus six times, the RVHSAA has strengthen the alumni's network throughout the years. This is mainly due to the RVHSAA Executive Committee's commitment and effort to connect those batches in holding sites, mainly the Queenstown and Malan Road campuses, as the graduates from these 2 campuses may not have a sense of belonging.

On 16 January 2026, the RVHSAA together with the school hosted President Tharman Shanmugaratnam for the school's 70th anniversary at SAFRA Jurong. More than 1,000 RVians attended the event, representing nearly all seventy batches—from the inaugural class of 1956 to the most recent of 2026, all in a spirit of shared camaraderie.

The River Valley High School Alumni Association launched the RVAConnect Digital Membership.

- Ang Mong Seng, former member of parliament for Hong Kah GRC
- Marcus Chin, television presenter, actor and comedian
- Goh Meng Seng, opposition politician and leader of the People's Power Party
- Kym Ng, actress and television host
- Peh Chin Hua, former member of parliament for Jalan Besar GRC
- Tham Yew Chin, writer and Cultural Medallion winner
- Wong Kah Chun, conductor of The Hallé
- Xiaxue, blogger and online television personality

== Gallery ==
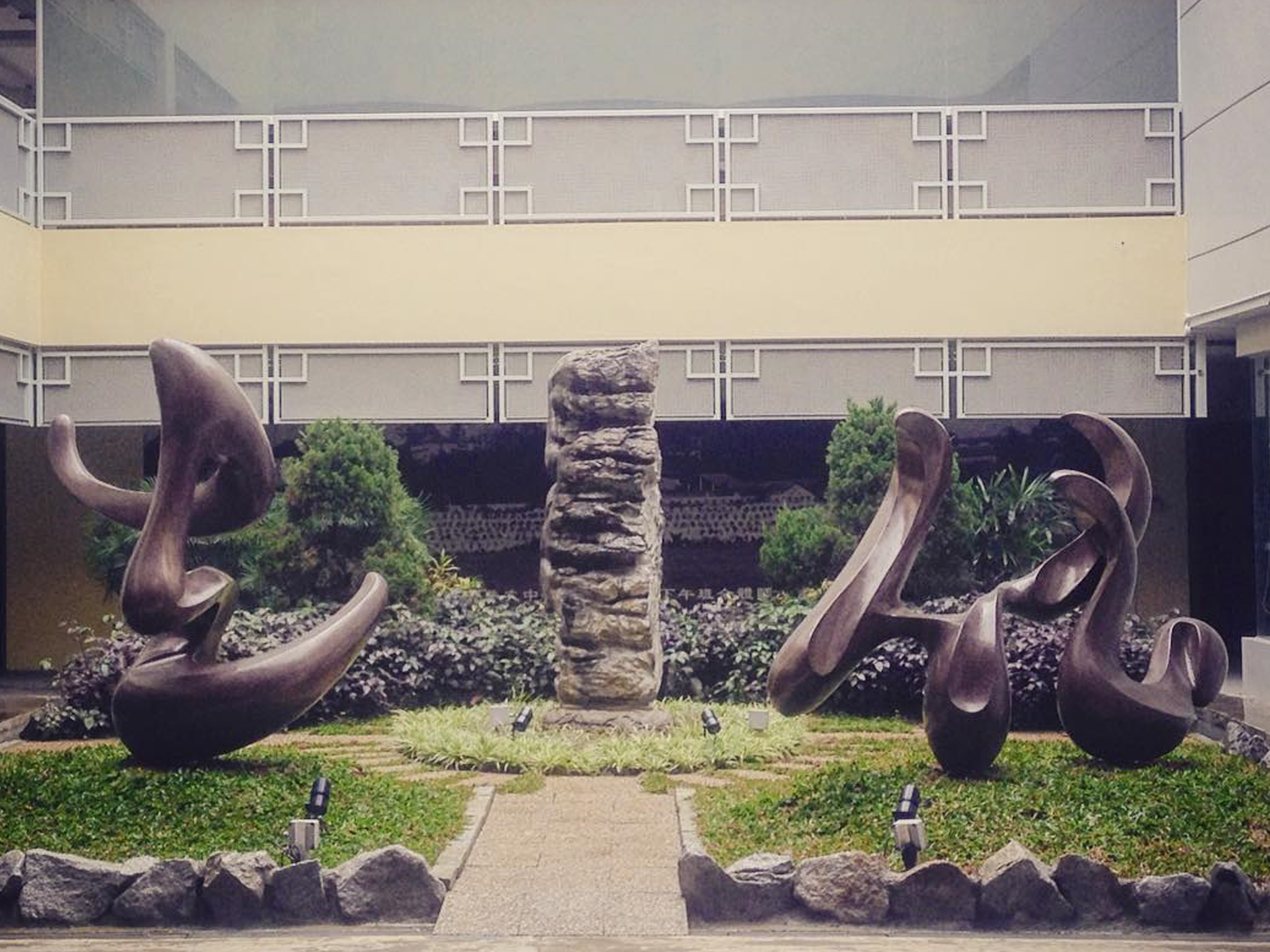
River Valley High School RV Spirit Sculpture.

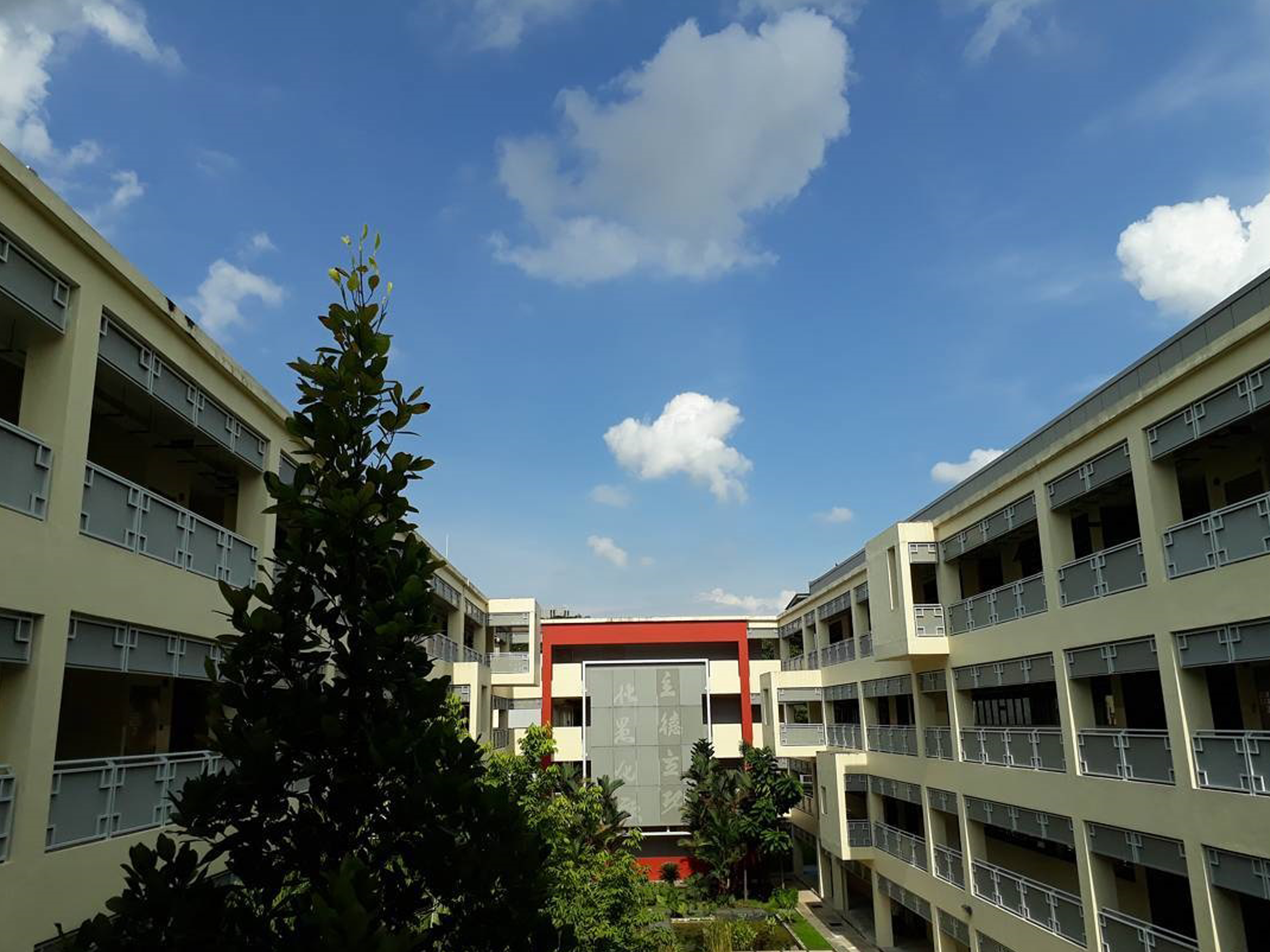
Classroom block of River Valley High School.

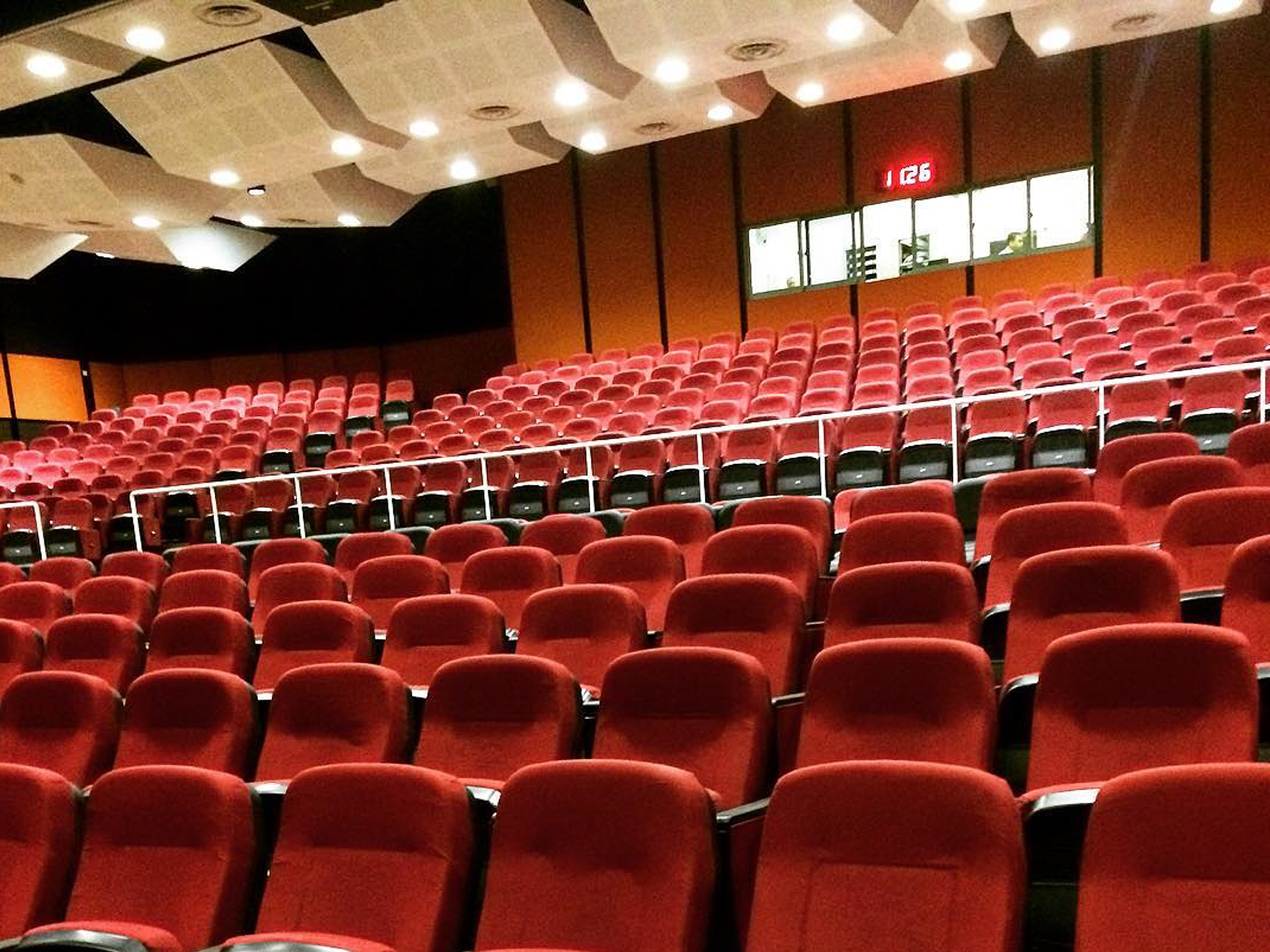
Auditorium (明辉堂) of River Valley High School.

== See also ==
- Education in Singapore
- Special Assistance Plan
- Integrated Program
