= Nanyang Junior College =

Government School in Singapore

- 南洋初级学院; Maktab Rendah Nanyang நன்யாங் ஜூனியர் கல்லூரி

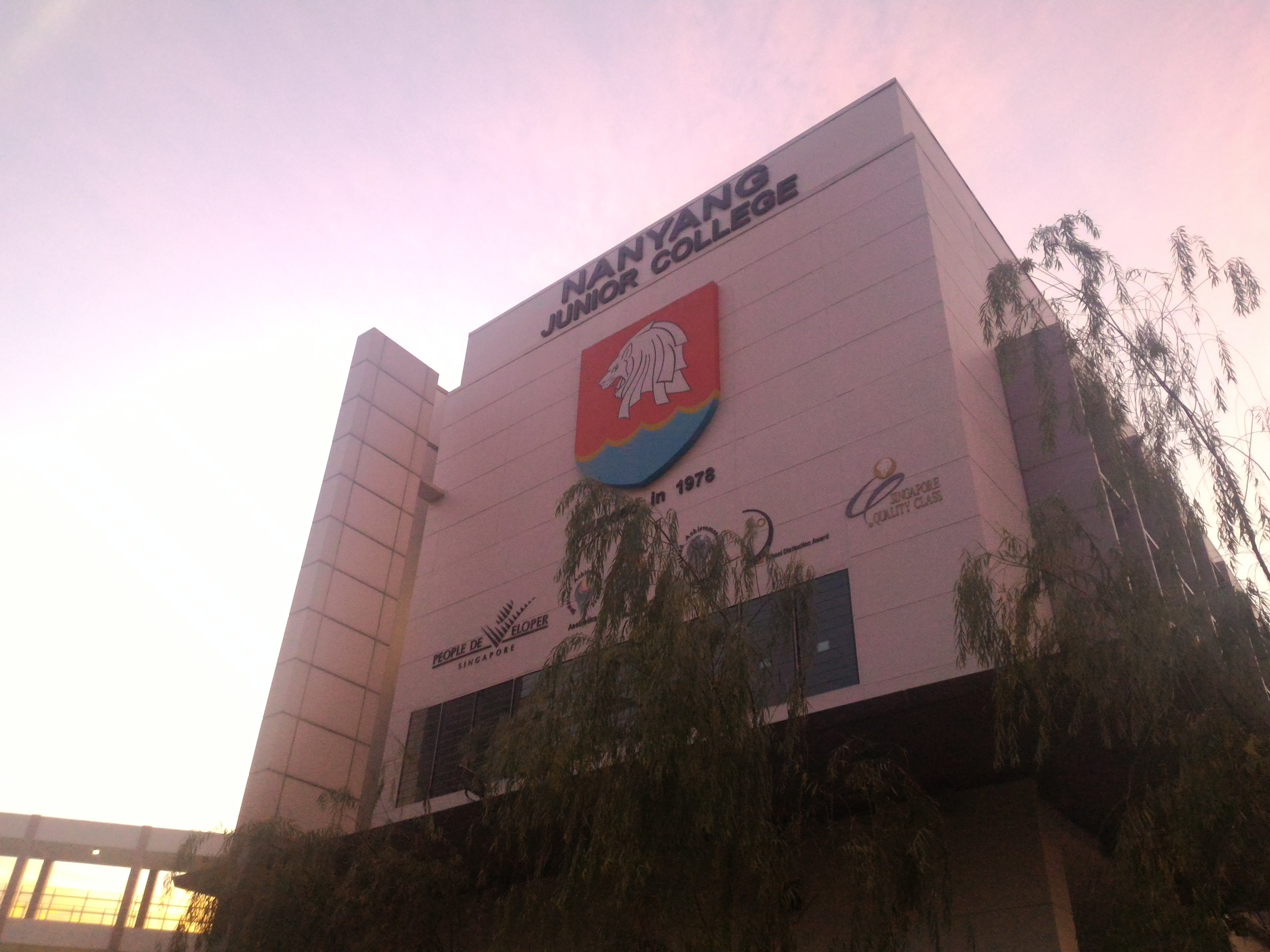

Location
- 128 Serangoon Avenue 3, Singapore 556111; Lorong Chuan, Serangoon; Singapore; 1.3507°N 103.866913°E

Information
- Type: Government-Aided
- Motto: 共同建设 (Together We Build)
- Established: 16 April 1977; 49 years ago
- Founder: Goh Tjoei Kok (BBM)
- Session: Single-session
- School code: 0805
- Principal: Pang Choon How
- Staff: approx. 160
- Gender: Mixed
- Enrolment: approx. 1400
- Language: Chinese, Malay, Tamil
- Colour: Blue Gold Red
- Song: "共同建设 – Together We Build"
- Affiliation: Chung Cheng High School; Chung Cheng High School (Yishun)
- Website: nanyangjc.moe.edu.sg

Nanyang Junior College (NYJC) (simplified Chinese: 南洋初级学院; traditional Chinese: 南洋初級學院; pinyin: Nányáng chūjí xuéyuàn; Wade–Giles: Nan^{2}yang^{2} Ch`u^{1}chi^{2} Hsüeh^{2}yüan^{4}) is a junior college in Singapore next to Lorong Chuan MRT station, offering two-year pre-university courses leading up to the GCE Advanced Level examinations.

Nanyang Junior College is known for its strong academics. Among its accomplishments, the college has produced six Public Service Commission (PSC) Scholarship recipients.

== History ==
=== Foundation years ===
Nanyang Junior College was founded in 1977 as Lorong Chuan Junior College. It was among the first government-aided junior colleges to be established in Singapore. The building committee led by Mr. Goh Tjoei Kok was formed in 1972. Construction of the college began in 1976 with funding and support from the Singapore Chinese Chamber of Commerce and Industry (SCCCI), which concurrently oversees the establishment of Hwa Chong Junior College, Singapore's second junior college and first government-aided junior college.

The college was renamed Nanyang Junior College in December 1977. The name "Nanyang" refers to the "Southern Seas" in Mandarin Chinese. The term was widely used by mainland Chinese people to refer to the region encompassed by Singapore, Malaysia, and the Southeast Asian region. The name is a reflection of the origins of Singapore having been built by immigrants predominantly from China, India, Malaysia, as well as other parts of the world.

The first cohort of about 600 Arts and Science students was enrolled in January 1978. Academic lessons were temporarily conducted at the former Westlake Secondary School campus. Construction of the major buildings and facilities at the permanent site along Serangoon Avenue 3 was completed in November 1978 and started administrative and academic operations the following month. Commerce stream and computer science were introduced into the college in 1979 and 1981 respectively. In 1981, Nanyang Junior College organised the 11th Pre-university Seminar in conjunction with the Ministry of Education.

As the campus of Nanyang Junior College was built on a small ridge, fog often covered part of the college in the 1980s and 1990s. Thus, the College was well known affectionately as "白云岗" (Chinese: Literal meaning "White Cloud Ridge"). This is also the inspiration for the brand name of the college's Chinese Cultural Society's annual drama production, "我们的白云岗" (Chinese: Literal meaning "Our White Cloud Ridge").

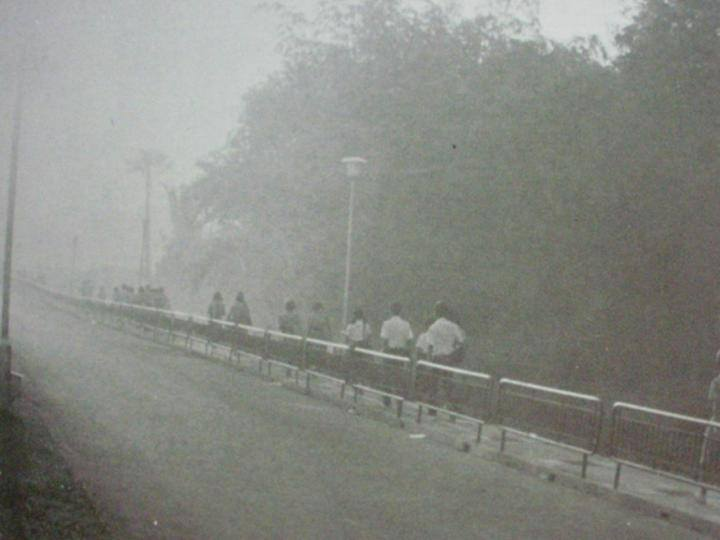
Students walking through the fog that covered the hilly campus every morning in 1988.

=== Transformation into a modern institution ===
On 21 May 1995, the College Resource Centre was opened. The three-story building housed the Resource Library, the Computer Centre, the AVA Room, and seminar rooms. In 1997, Nanyang Junior College was selected to be the second college in Singapore to offer the Art Elective Programme (AEP). From 15 January 1999, Nanyang Junior College joined Hwa Chong Junior College and Temasek Junior College as the third pre-university center in Singapore to offer the Chinese Language Elective Programme (C-LEP). Nanyang Junior College was selected by the Ministry of Education in 2000 for an on-site re-development of its campus under the PRIME project. in which the Ministry of Education bored 95 percent of the re-development costs. The three-phrase re-development work included the construction of a new main building, which features new science and computer laboratories, a new library, and four new lecture theatres. Lessons and administrative operations continued in the old building and subsequently in temporary tutorial rooms and offices as the works were carried out between 2001 and 2004. The reconstruction works were briefly halted in 2003 due to the bankruptcy of the main contractor, which also affected a number of residential developments in Marine Terrace. The college moved into the newly re-developed campus building in January 2004, and officially declared the completion of the redevelopment works in June 2005. A stone feature, on which wrote "饮水思源" was donated by Mdm Ho Won Ho on her retirement as the principal of Nanyang Junior College in 2005.

In 2006, the school's executive committee proposed a change to the school's name to: "Chung Cheng Junior College", to signify the affiliation of Nanyang Junior College with Chung Cheng High (Main) and Chung Cheng High (Yishun). This proposition is overwhelmingly rejected by the alumni and staff, as well as prominent academics, stating the strong college heritage, as well as the political sensitivity of the name "Chung Cheng (中正)". In an academic article featured in Lianhe Zaobao in 2002, it was stated that the adoption of the name "Nanyang" in 1978 resulted of the strong objection by the society, due to the strong historical association of the name "Chung Cheng" to Kuomintang's founding leader Chiang Kai-shek, even with the clarifications made in a historical statement in 1940.

== Principal ==
| English name | Native name | Years served |
|---|---|---|
| Chia Khoon Hock | 谢坤福 | 1977–1995 |
| So Bie Leng | 苏美玲 | 1996–2000 |
| Ho Woon Ho | 冯焕好 | 2001–2005 |
| Kwek Hiok Chuang | 郭毓川 | 2006–2016 |
| Low Chun Meng | 刘俊铭 | 2017–2023 |
| Pang Choon How | 彭俊豪 | 2024–present |

== Campus ==
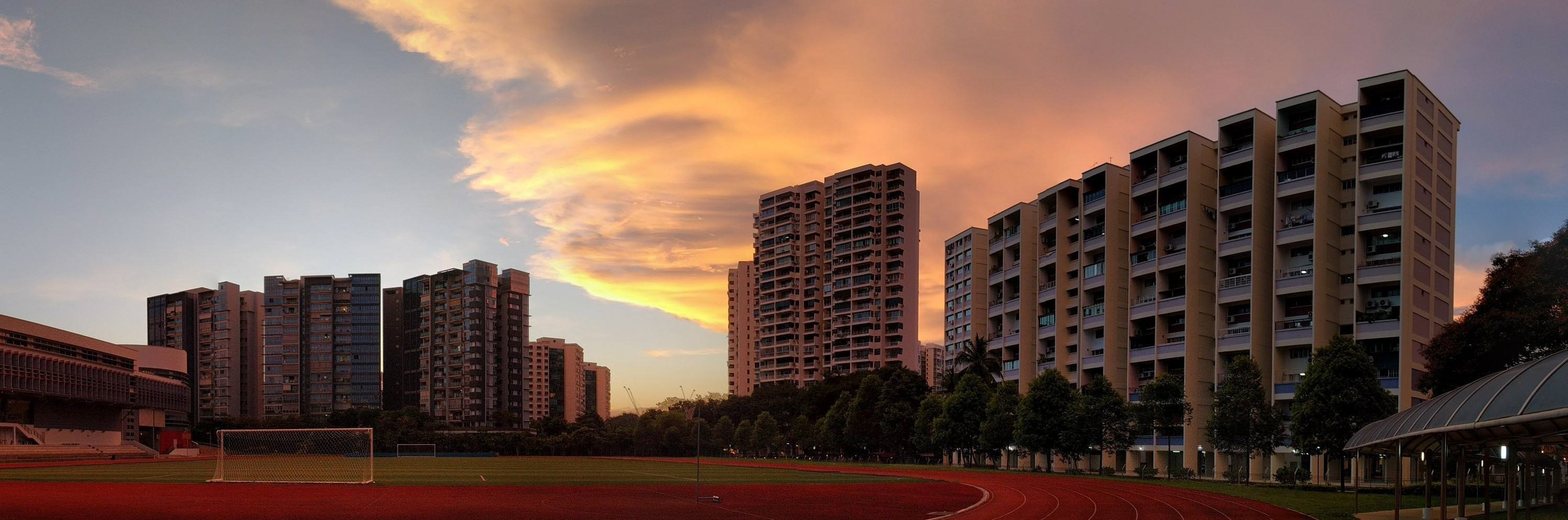
A view of Nanyang Junior College's facade and running track at dusk.

Nanyang Junior College's campus was built on a hilly ridge off Lorong Chuan and underwent a redevelopment in the 2000s to keep up with the changes to the academic and non-academic curriculum.

== Academic information ==
Nanyang Junior College offers Arts and Science courses that lead up to the Singapore-Cambridge GCE Advanced Level examinations.

As a student-centered junior college, NYJC is quoted locally as the most flexible college in terms of its availability of subject combinations, and allowing deserving students to undertake elective programmes even without relevant backgrounds. The college consistently performed well above national standards for the GCE A Level examination since the 1980s. The college was consistently ranked as the top-performing mid-tier junior college and the seventh in national ranking throughout the 1990s.

Starting in the 2000s, NYJC has come into prominence for its steady rise among colleges with the most competitive academic achievements, faring well above the national average for most subjects at the annual GCE A Level examination.

=== Academic subjects ===
| H1 Level | H2 Level | H3 Level |
|---|---|---|
| Biology; Chemistry; Chinese Language; Economics; General Paper; Geography; History; Literature in English; Malay Language; Mathematics; Physics; Project Work; Tamil Language | History; Geography; Economics; Literature in English; Chinese Language and Literature; Malay Language and Literature; Translation; Art; Computing; Mathematics; Further Mathematics; Physics; Chemistry; Biology | Biology; Chemistry; Physics; Mathematics; History; Economics; Geography; Art; Chinese Language and Literature; Literature in English |

=== Language Elective Programme ===
As a ministry-designated Cluster Centre of Excellence for Chinese Language, Nanyang Junior College offers the Chinese Language Elective Programme (C-LEP, or 语特) since 1999. To date, it has produced many outstanding graduates across various fields of work.

The ministry head programmes encompass many inter-school enrichment activities and initiatives among the five participating institutions, aimed to enhance students’ learning and cultivate a deeper interest in the Chinese language and culture. These include dedicated lecture series, camps, oversea immersion trips, editing and publishing of literary works, as well as internships. In NYJC, this inter-school programme is complemented by the NYJC LEP Programme, which include school-based enrichments such as production of the annual play "Our White Cloud Ridge" (我们的白云岗), as well as organising the annual National Translation Competition. The college also award the NYJC Bicultural Award and the NYJC Award for Excellence-in-Chinese (传薪奖) to graduating students with outstanding performance and contribution.

Students are required to undertake H2 Chinese Language and Literature and a Chinese Language-related subject to be eligible for the program. As with other institutions offering the C-LEP, students under the programme enjoys two bonus points in their admission to Nanyang Junior College. Singaporean students are eligible for the two-year Chinese Language Elective Scholarship offered by the Ministry of Education.

=== Art Elective Programme ===
Nanyang Junior College offers the Art Elective Programme since 1997. The college is also one of the ministries designated Cluster Centre of Excellence for the Arts. The college is known for its strength in the teaching of arts and its egalitarian stance, accepting students that have a passion for arts but deprived of a considerable background.

== Co-curricular activities ==
Nanyang Junior College is well known for its forte in Volleyball, Dragonboat, Table tennis, Performing Arts and Robotics. In 2017, the Volleyball Boys' and Girls' teams created history by becoming the first college to obtain both championship titles in the same year. Both teams repeated this feat in 2018 and 2019.

JC1 students are allowed to set up non-sports Student Interest Groups (SIGs), which functions very much like a typical CCA in College, albeit without official college funding. They act as a more carefree and lower commitment way for students to explore their interests. There are over 40 SIGs recognised by the school.

| Sports | Aesthetics Groups | Clubs & Societies | Student Interest Groups (SIGs) |
|---|---|---|---|
| Badminton; Basketball; Dragonboat Team; Football; Floorball; Netball; Squash; Table Tennis; Tchoukball; Tennis; Touch Rugby; Volleyball | AEP Club; Symphonic Band; Chinese Cultural Society; Chinese Orchestra; Choir; English Drama; Dance Society; Guzheng Ensemble; Photographic Society | AVA Club; Biz Club; Channel News Nanyang; Red Cross Humanitarian; Interact Club; Gym Club; Chinese Cultural Society; Outdoor Activities Club; Robotics Club; Science Research Programme; The Drum (Media Resource Library) | Chinese Debate; Debate; Diabolo; Economics Society; EngiNYeering; Green Alliance; Hanja; History and Current Affairs Society (HACAS); Indian Cultural Society; JFire; Korzy; Mathematics Club; Ministry of Recreational Games; Nanyang Acoustic Movement; Nanyang Astronomy Club (NYAstro); Nanyang Competitive Programming Club (NYCP); Nanyang Financial Literacy (NYFL); Nanyang Harmonix (NYHX); Nanyang Musicians Club; Nanyang Philosophy and Psychology Club; Nanyang SLab; Nanyang Strings Ensemble (NYSE); NY Alchemy; NY BioNat; NY Chess Club; NY Crescendo; NY Financial Literacy; NY Legal Lions; NY Rocks; NY Voices; NY Writer's Circle; NYArts; NYCrochers; NYCubers; NYMagic; NYMP; NYpianists; NYQY; NYShuFa; NYThreads; Paws On Parade |

== Notable alumni ==
=== Politics ===
- Fadli Fawzi, Member of Parliament for Aljunied GRC
- Muhammad Faishal Ibrahim, Former Acting Minister-in-charge of Muslim Affairs
- Low Thia Khiang, former Leader of the Opposition
- Teo Ser Luck, former Minister of State
- Ng Phek Hoong Irene, former Member of Parliament
- Yeo Guat Kwang, former Member of Parliament
- Chia Kiah Hong, Steve, former Non-constituency Member of Parliament
- Ong Hua Han, former Nominated Member of Parliament

=== Military ===
- Neo Kian Hong, sixth Chief of Defence Force and former CEO of SMRT Corporation

=== Medicine ===
- Lim Kah Leong, senior research scientist (adjunct), National Neuroscience Institute; associate professor, department of physiology, National University of Singapore; associate professor, Duke-NUS Graduate Medical School

=== Arts ===
- Sarah Choo Jing, Multidisciplinary fine artist
- Jaspers Lai, actor
- Faith Ng, playwright

== Gallery ==
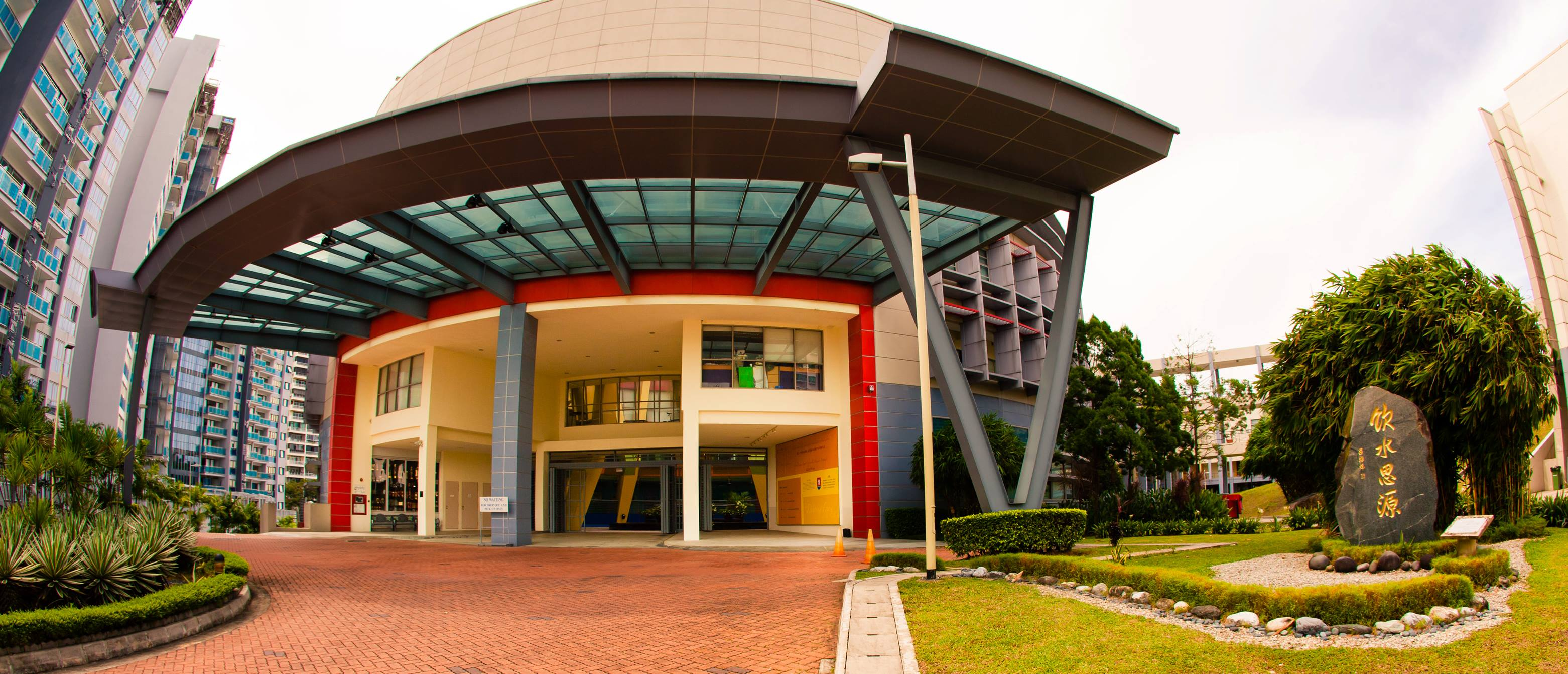
Administrative Block of Nanyang Junior College

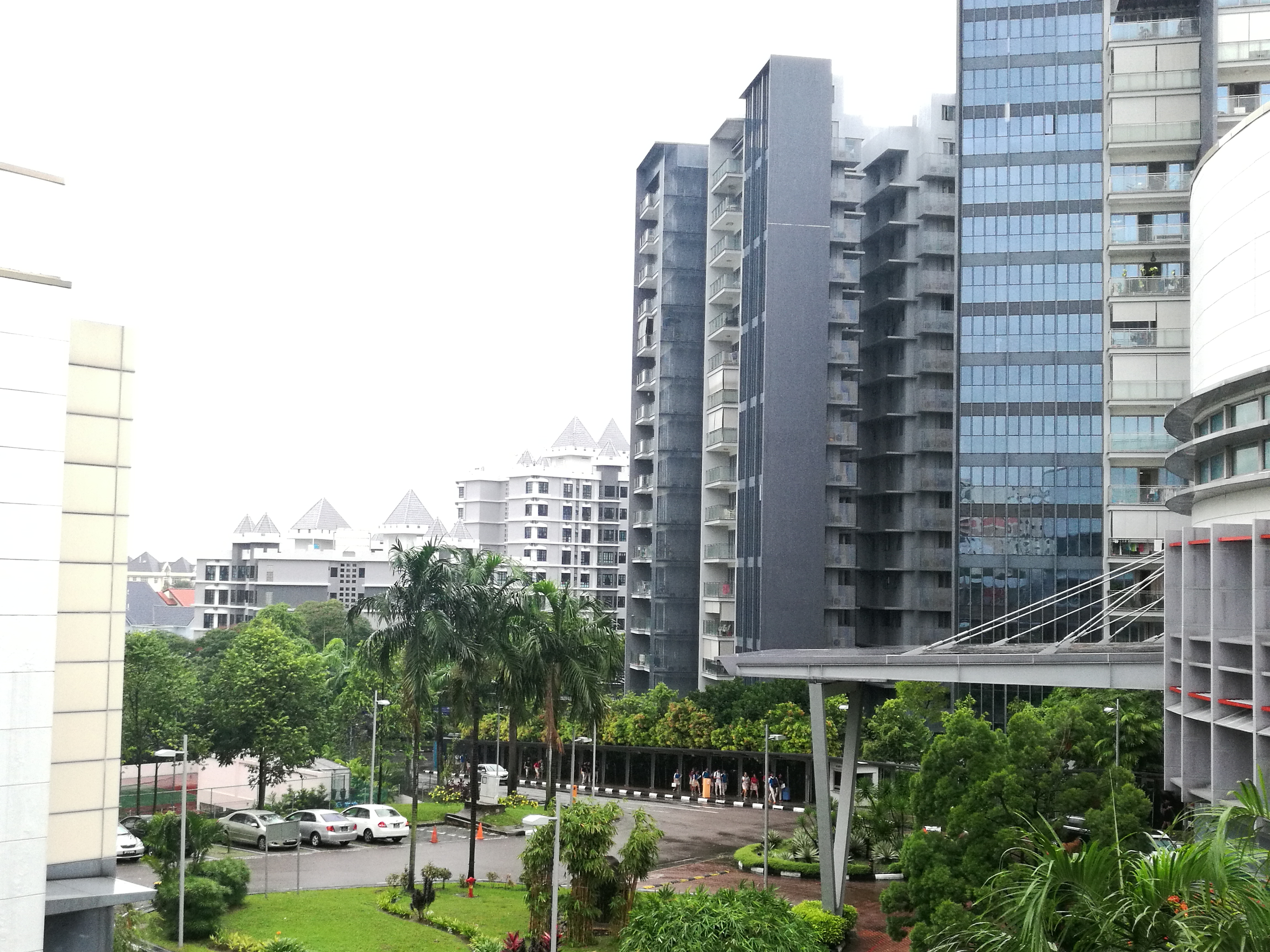
A view of the car poach and the main entrance lane of Nanyang Junior College.

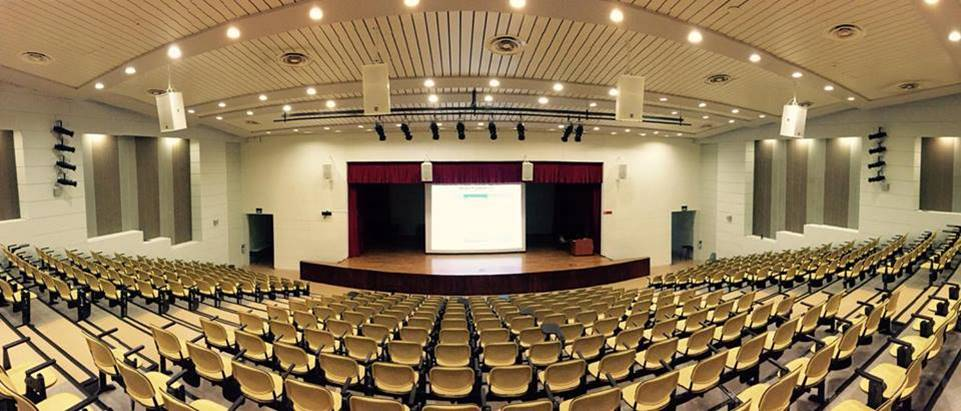
Lecture Theatre No.4 of Nanyang Junior College.

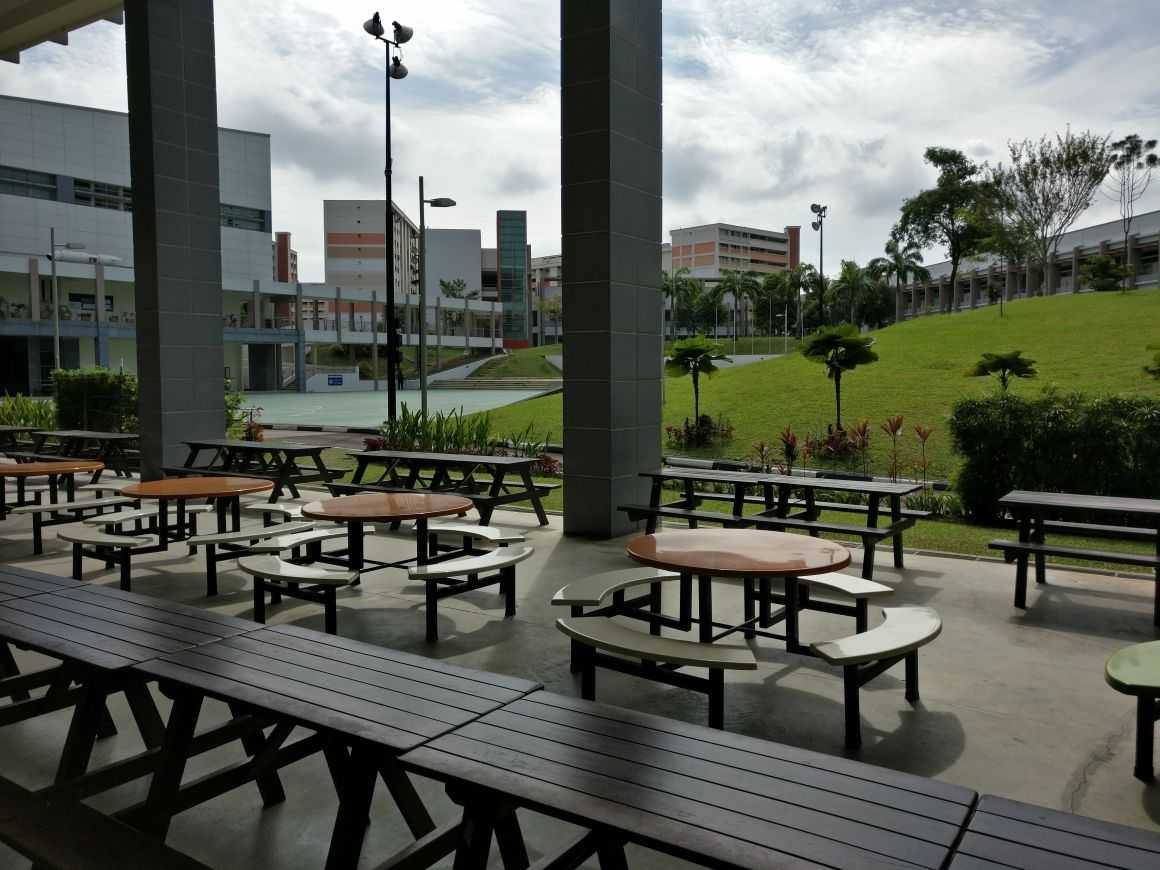
Study area outside the Lecture Theatre No 4 of Nanyang Junior College.

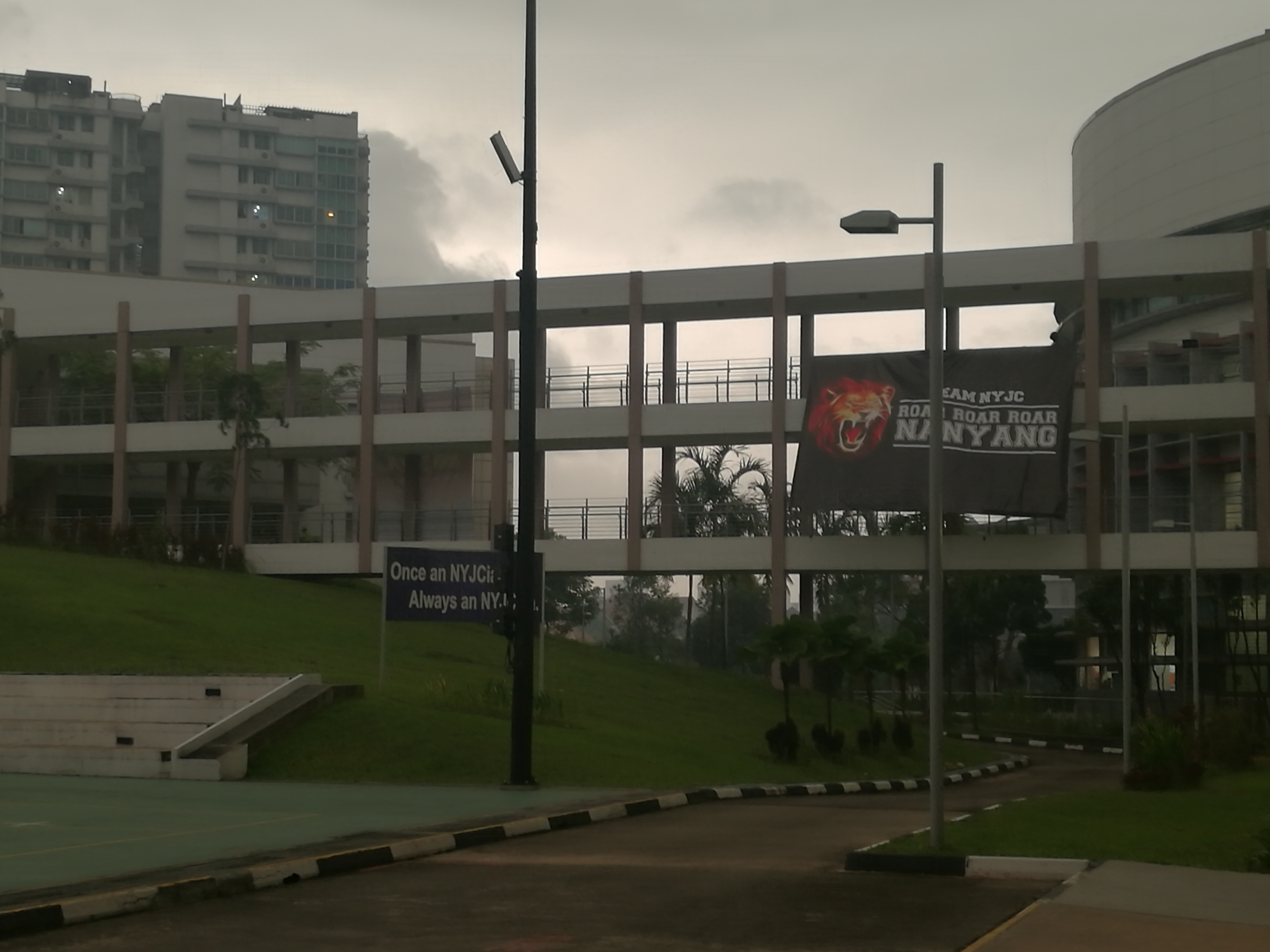
The bridge link between the Main Block and the Science Block of Nanyang Junior College.

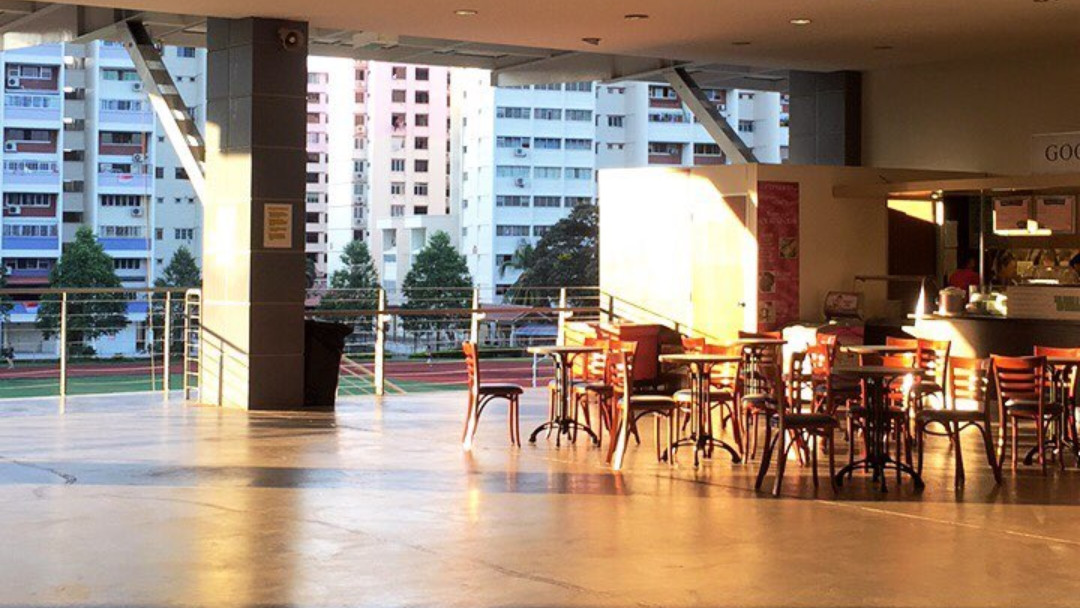
The Atrium of Nanyang Junior College, featuring a café. The Grandstand and the Tracks & Field is in the background.

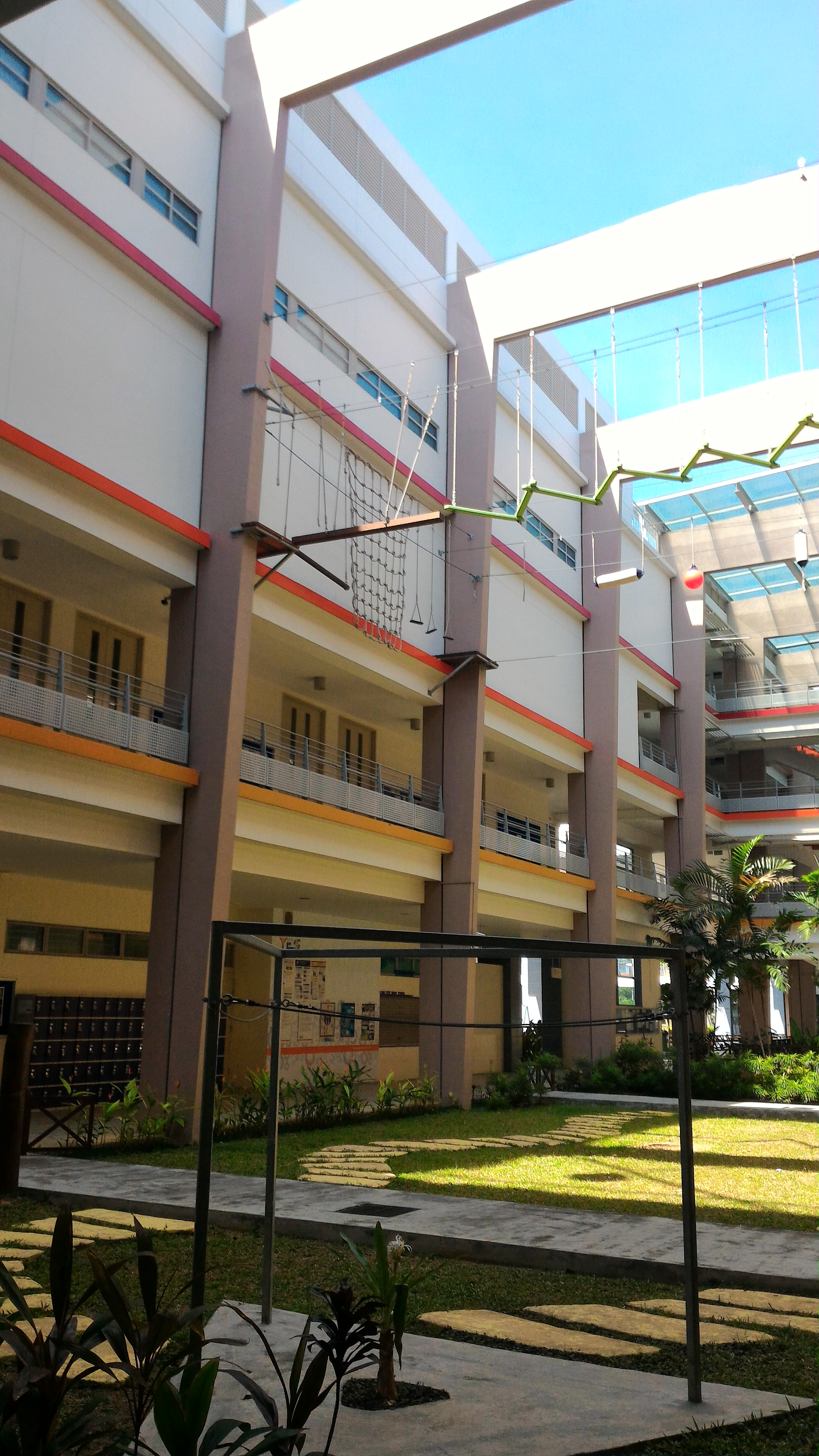
High elements rope course installed within the main building of Nanyang Junior College.

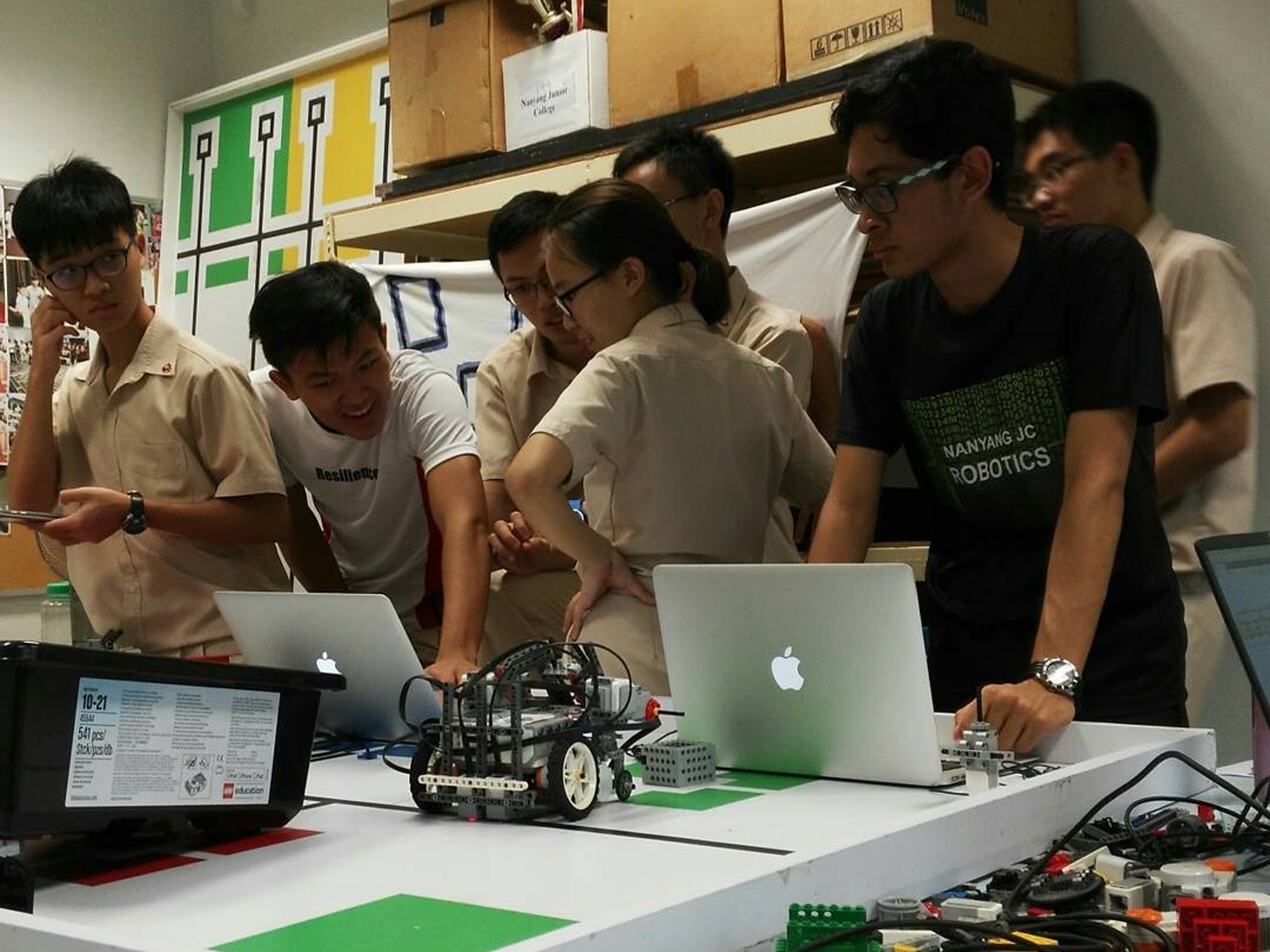
A regular training session in Nanyang Junior College Robotics Club. Robotics is a niche co-curricular programme at Nanyang Junior College.

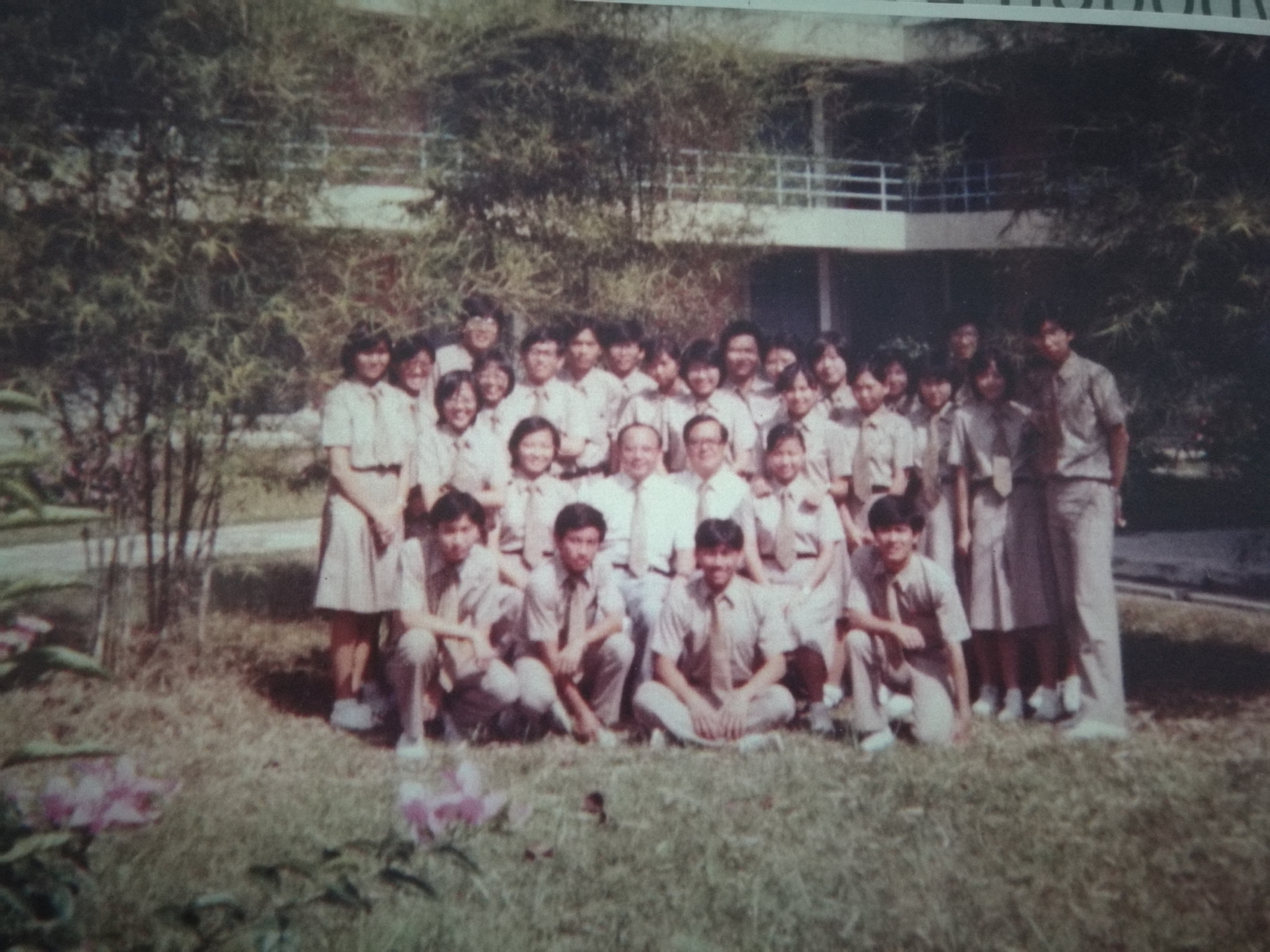
A civics tutorial group photo taken at Nanyang Junior College in 1993.

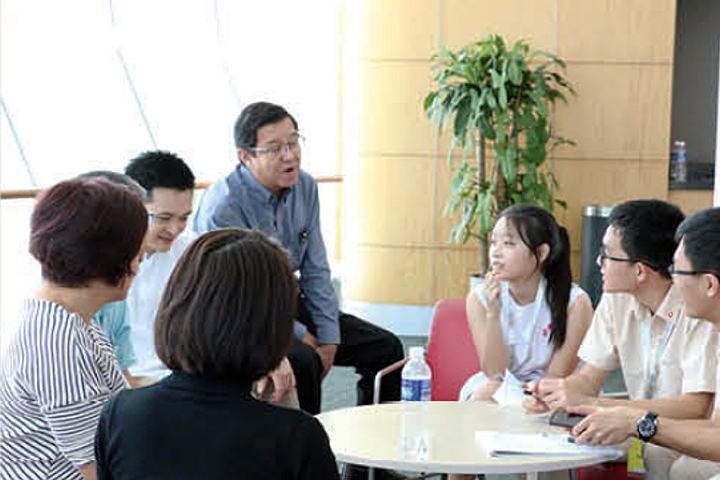
Nanyang Junior College and Nanyang Girls' High School students engaging with industry leaders at Mahota Symposium 2016 held at the National Library Singapore.
