= Chuang Chu Lin =

Chinese educator

Chuang Chulin (Dr.) (莊竹林)
- Born: 27 July 1900; Hui'an District, Quanzhou, Fujian, Qing Empire
- Died: 4 January 1973 (aged 72); Singapore
- Occupation: Educator
- Known for: Education in China and Southeast Asia
- Spouse: ?
- Children: ?
- Parent: ?
- Relatives: ?

Chuang Chu Lin
- Traditional Chinese: 莊竹林
- Simplified Chinese: 庄竹林
Transcriptions
Standard Mandarin
- Hanyu Pinyin: Zhuāng zhúlín

Chuang Chu Lin (27 July 1900 – 4 January 1973), also spelled as Zhuang Zhulin, was a pioneer educator in Singapore. He is the founding principal for Chung Cheng High School, and vice-chancellor of Nanyang University, the first Chinese university in Southeast Asia.

== Contributions ==
Zhuang was among the Chinese community leaders that advocated for the founding of Chung Cheng High School, the second full Chinese middle school after The Chinese High School. As the founding principal, Zhuang backed the post-war expansion of the institution as enrolment increased.

Zhuang was appointed the principal for Nanyang University, also known as "Nantah", when it was established in 1955.
