= Kong Hwa School =

School in Singapore

Coordinates: 1.311095°N 103.888218°E

- 光華學校
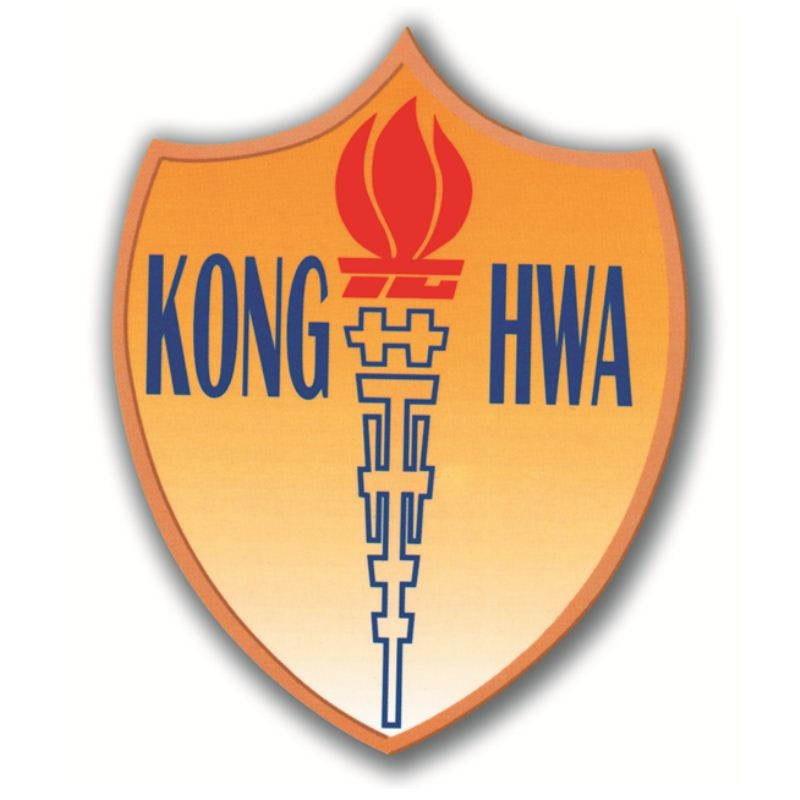
- Motto: Sincerity and Perseverance
- Type: Government-aided
- Established: 4 May 1953; 73 years ago
- Principal: Raymond Poon Siow Leng
- Students: Approx. 1,600
- Location: 350 Guillemard Road, Mountbatten, Singapore 399772
- Colours: Yellow White
- Website: http://konghwa.moe.edu.sg/

Kong Hwa School (abbreviation: KHS; Chinese: traditional Chinese: 光華學校; simplified Chinese: 光华学校; pinyin: Guānghuá Xuéxiào) is a co-educational Special Assistance Plan (SAP) primary school located on Guillemard Road in the Mountbatten area of Singapore. It is one of the six schools affiliated with the Singapore Hokkien Huay Kuan, the others being Tao Nan School, Ai Tong School, Chongfu Primary School, Nan Chiau Primary School, and Nan Chiau High School.

Kong Hwa School established the Bi-Cultural Enrichment Programme (BiCEP) in 2007, encouraging students to learn another language and become bilingual.

== History ==
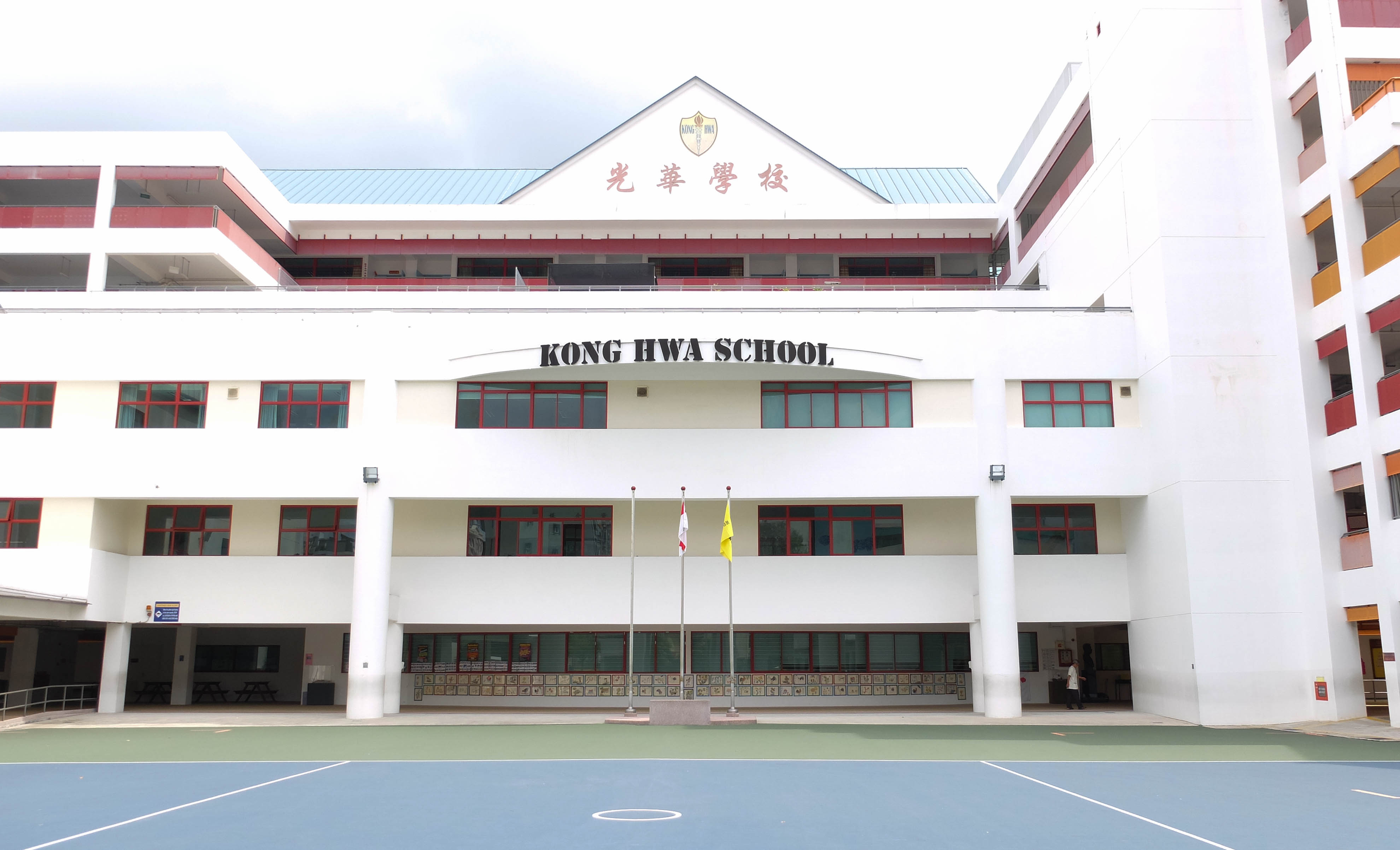
The current Kong Hwa School building along Guillemard Road, Singapore.

Kong Hwa School was founded by the Singapore Hokkien Huay Kuan (SHHK) in 1953. This was immediately after the Japanese Occupation, when the committee members of the SHHK realized the urgent need for education and a severe shortage of schools in Singapore. The school currently stands at its original location on Guillemard Road, land donated by Tan Lark Sye.

Initially, Kong Hwa School was named ‘Kong Chian School’ after Lee Kong Chian made a personal donation of $300,000. Further reasoning and support for the name included the Chinese proverb “光前裕後” (guāng qián yù hòu), which means "defend the honor of your ancestors and benefit the future generations."

However, Lee, who was in London at the time, sent a letter to the chairman of the SHHK, Tan Lark Sye. He expressed that times were changing and that philanthropy should be a common occurrence and not something so unusual. Thus, Lee requested that the SHHK rename the school. In response to his repeated pleas, the SHHK officially changed the school's name to Kong Hwa School on 1 May 1953.

In April 1957, the school accepted the government’s full grants-in-aid and became a government-aided school.

At the end of 1960, the Singapore Hokkien Huay Kuan acquired an adjacent plot of land measuring 5,574 square metres (approximately 60,000 square feet) for $90,000 to construct a secondary school wing. When Nan Chiau Girls’ High School underwent reconstruction, its students were temporarily accommodated in the newly completed Kong Hwa Wing.

After the reconstruction of Nan Chiau Girls’ High School was completed, members of the Singapore Hokkien Huay Kuan council and the management committee of Chung Cheng High School (Branch) reached an agreement. Under this arrangement, the Kong Hwa Wing building was exchanged for the Chung Cheng High School (Branch) campus on Kim Yam Road. Chung Cheng High School (Branch) was thus relocated to Guillemard Road and become Kong Hwa’s neighbour

=== Renovation ===
As the school’s enrollment grew, its facilities needed to grow with it. Kong Hwa School began an upgrading project by temporarily moving classes off campus so construction could proceed. From 1992 to 1996, the school operated from a holding site on Aljunied Road at the former Aljunied Primary School campus.

A second round of upgrading began in 2010, focusing on new buildings and improved learning spaces. During this period, the school relocated to the former MacPherson Secondary School campus on Circuit Road, where it remained until June 2012.

== Culture ==
=== Uniform ===
The boys' uniform consists of a white shirt and khaki shorts, and the girls' uniform consists of a white sleeveless blouse and a knee-length accordion-pleated skirt. Both uniforms have the school crest emblazoned on the left. While school shoes and socks can be purchased, any white-based shoes or socks (except ankle socks) are allowed.

=== Sports Day ===
All affiliated primary schools (Tao Nan School, Ai Tong School, Chongfu Primary School, and Nan Chiau Primary School) and Kong Hwa School participate in the annual sports day event held by the Singapore Hokkien Huay Kuan.

=== Main Parade Square ===
The sixty-four hexagrams of the “I Ching” are inscribed in the tiling patterns found in the Main Parade Square. The square has two walls which bear the school motto: "sincerity and perseverance." School assemblies are held here.

=== Amphitheatre ===
The amphitheatre was designed to provide an environment for promoting Western culture surrounding performing arts and public skills.

=== Chinese Garden ===
The school contains the “Kong Hwa Garden” (Chinese: 光华苑), an artistic replica of a typical Jiangnan-styled Chinese garden design. This place serves as a place to promote Chinese culture and as a third space for students and faculty.
