= Singapore Hokkien Huay Kuan =

Clan association in Singapore

- 新加坡福建會館
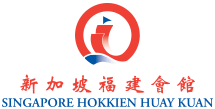
- Abbreviation: SHHK
- Formation: 1840
- Founded at: Thian Hock Keng Temple, Telok Ayer, Singapore
- Type: Non-Profit Organisation; Clan Association; Cultural & Educational Foundation
- Registration no.: 193700041W
- Headquarters: Singapore Hokkien Huay Kuan Building
- Location(s): 5 Sennett Road Singapore 466781
- Coordinates: 1.315935°N 103.938313°E
- Members: 5000+ (2014)
- Chairman: Mr Chua Thian Poh
- Vice-Chairman: Mr Tan Cheng Gay
- Board of Governors: Mr Ong Pang Boon; Mr Khaw Boon Wan; Ms Lee Sze Yeng; Mr Chua Seng Chong; Mr Chan Hock Keng
- Website: www.shhk.com.sg

Singapore Hokkien Huay Kuan (SHHK) (traditional Chinese: 新加坡福建會館; simplified Chinese: 新加坡福建会馆; pinyin: Xīnjiāpō Fújiàn Huìguǎn; Pe̍h-ōe-jī: Sin-ka-pho Hok-kiàn Hōe-koán), or the Singapore Hokkien Association in English, is a cultural and educational foundation. It was established in 1840 to promote education, social welfare and the preservation of the Chinese language and culture among Chinese Singaporean and other Overseas Chinese groups in Southeast Asia. As of 2014, the SHHK, which has 5000 members, is the largest clan association in Singapore.

== History ==
In the early 19th century, many immigrants from Fujian Province of China came to settle in Southeast Asia, including Singapore. These immigrants established several clan associations to address the social needs of this immigrant community. The Singapore Hokkien Huay Kuan was the first such organization to be established in 1840 on the grounds of the Thian Hock Keng Temple. However, the SHHK also served other members of the Chinese community who came from other parts of China.

In 1929, the philanthropist Tan Kah Kee became the president of Singapore Hokkien Huay Kuan. In 1986, SHHK became one of the seven founding members of the Singapore Federation of Chinese Clan Associations. SHHK represented the interests of Hokkien-speaking Chinese Singaporean, while Sam Kiang Huay Kuan catered to those from Zhejiang, Jiangsu, and Jiangxi; the Singapore Hock Chew Association promoted the Fuzhou dialect; the Singapore Kiung Chow Hwee Kuan to Hainanese; Singapore Kwangtung Hui Kuan to Cantonese; Singapore Nanyang Khek Community Guild promoted Hakka culture; and Singapore Teochew Poit Ip Huay Kuan for Teochew.

In 2014, the clan moved its headquarters from Telok Ayer Street, where it had been based at for 174 years, to the former premises of Changkat Changi Secondary School. Its new headquarters also houses the SHHK-run pre-school and a cultural centre.

In 2025, the clan celebrated its 185 Years Anniversary. In conjunction with the celebration, SHHK (Singapore Hokkien Huay Kuan) held a 185th anniversary charity run and walk on May 18th, 2025, at Nanyang Technological University (NTU). Among the more than 800 people who attended, 185 chose the 5km charity run, and about 600 others walked 1.85km around the Yunnan Garden of Nanjing University. The Singapore Hokkien Huay Kuan pointed out that the event aims to celebrate their partnership with NTU and all funds raised will be donated to NTU to support education. The fundraising target is 1.85 million dollars.

In 1953, Singapore Hokkien Huay Kuan donated the parcel of land for Nanyang University and construction of the university began shortly after. Tan Lark Sye along with Quah Chin Lai played a significant role in supporting the establishment of Nanyang University via the Singapore Hokkien Huay Kuan.

== Educational projects ==
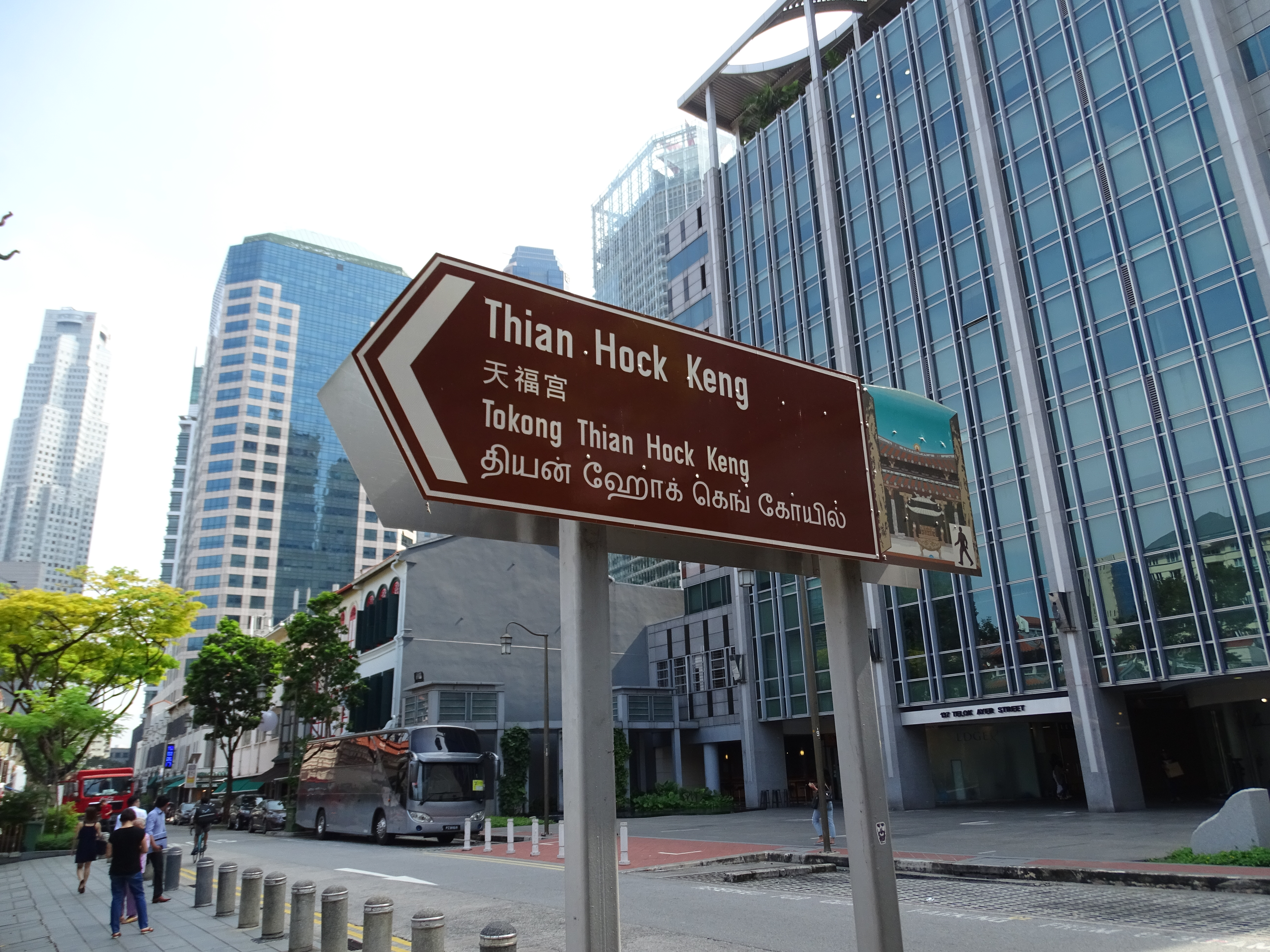
137, Telok Ayer Street (on the right side), 1955 to 2014 headquarters of SHHK

=== Affiliated Institutions ===
Singapore Hokkien Huay Kuan is actively involved in the education scene in Singapore since its founding. It established its first school, Tao Nan School in 1906. Subsequently, it established Ai Tong School in 1912, Chong Hock Girls' School (current Chongfu School) in 1915, Nan Chiau Girls' High School in 1947 and Kong Hwa School in 1953. Today, all 6 schools continue to be affiliated to the Singapore Hokkien Huay Kuan, and emphasize the teaching of Chinese culture and values. The schools are all highly regarded by Singaporeans.

The SHHK also donated land for the construction of the Nanyang University (now Nanyang Technological University) campus in 1955. In 2010, the clan also set up a pre-school with an emphasis on Chinese and bilingual education.

==== Collaboration with the Singapore University of Technology and Design (SUTD) ====
On 16 February 2019, a collaboration with Singapore University of Technology and Design (SUTD) was announced by Singapore Hokkien Huay Kuan, and was followed by a signing of Memorandum of Understanding. Students from the six institutions affiliated to Singapore Hokkien Huay Kuan will benefit from corporate partnership through school-based programmes co-developed with SUTD. These programmes aim to inspire students to empower and embrace students with literacy in technology, design and innovation.

=== Promotion of Chinese Literacy ===
In support of promoting Chinese literary writing and raise the standard of Chinese Language in Singapore, the SHHK Literacy Awards were established since 2003 as an amalgamation of the SHHK Primary Schools Chinese Essay Writing Competition (since 1984), National Secondary School Chinese Creative Writing Competition – Xin Lei Jiang (since 2003), as well as the Singapore Tertiary Chinese Literary Awards (since 2002), which SHHK is the main sponsor.

== Religious projects ==
SHHK manages the operations of four temples in Singapore:

- Thian Hock Keng Temple (Chinese: 天福宮), built in 1839
- Goh Chor Tua Peh Kong Temple (Chinese: 梧槽大伯公庙), built in 1847
- Kim Lan Beo Temple (Chinese: 金兰庙), first built in 1830 & moved to current location in 1984
- Leng San Teng Temple (Chinese: 麟山亭北极宫), built in 1879

== Sources of funding ==
SHHK has two wholly owned real-estate development subsidiaries, Yunnan Realty Pte. Ltd. and Balestier Realty Pte. Ltd., which develop properties for sale and rental.

== News articles ==
- "Thousands of historical records from Hokkien community to be made publicly available". The Straits Times (online). 2021-02-28.
- "Exhibition sheds light on architectural influence between Fujian, Singapore". The Straits Times (online). 2019-10-28.
