= List of Hwa Chong Institution people =

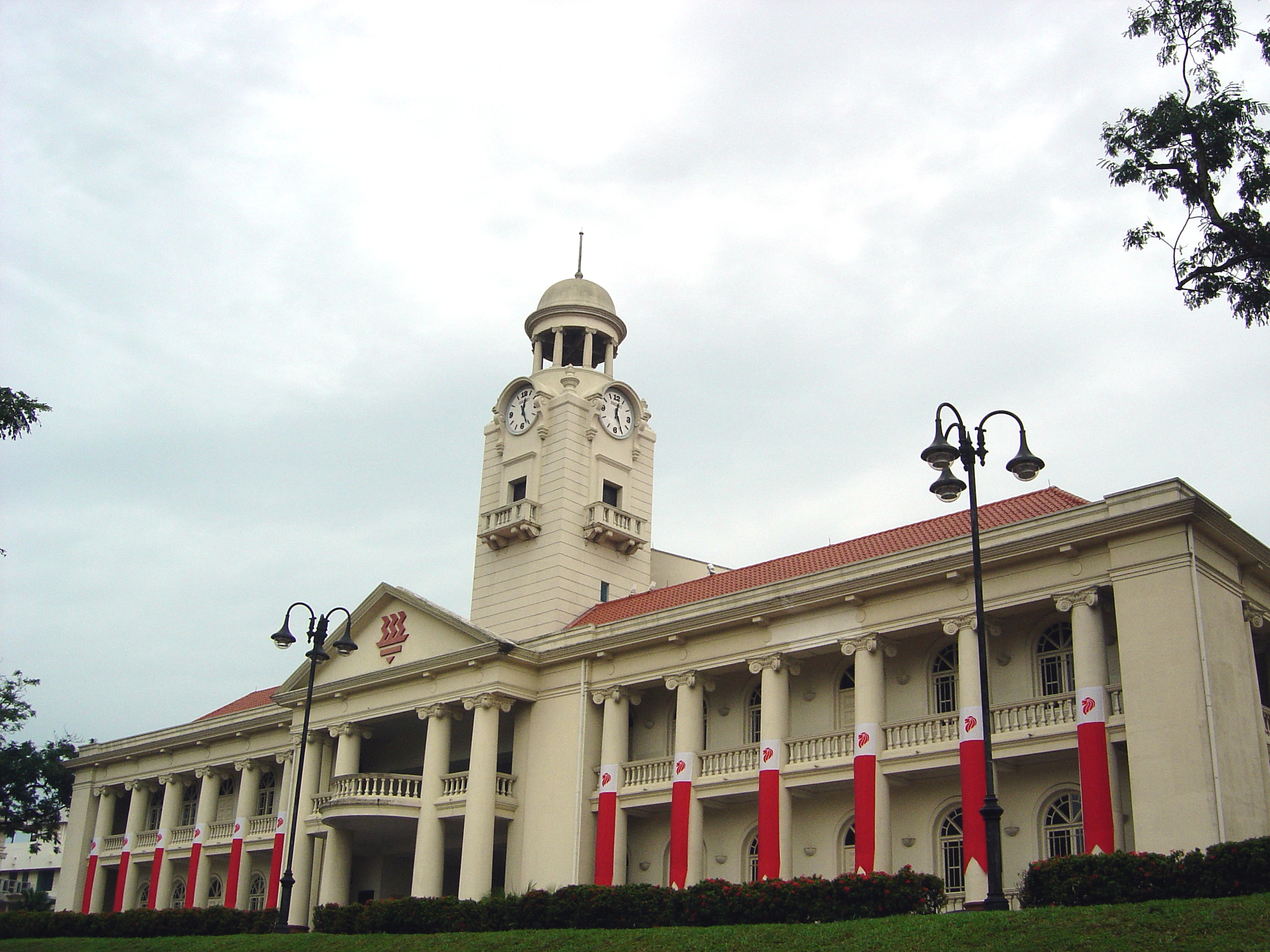
The Clock Tower Building of Hwa Chong Institution, a national monument, which formerly served as an observation point during the Battle of Singapore

The following is a list of notable staff and alumni from Hwa Chong Institution (HCI) and its predecessor schools, The Chinese High School (TCHS) and Hwa Chong Junior College (HCJC).

== Notable staff ==
- Chen Wen Hsi Singaporean pioneer artist; taught art at TCHS.
- Lao She, writer; taught at TCHS in 1929
- Lee Kong Chian, businessman and philanthropist; served as chairman of TCHS's board of directors from 1934 to 1956
- Lim Hak Tai, founder and first principal of the Nanyang Academy of Fine Arts; taught art and mathematics at TCHS
- Liu Kang, oil painter; taught art at TCHS
- Tan Kah Kee, businessman and philanthropist; founded TCHS in 1918
- Tan Keong Choon, businessman and philanthropist; Tan Kah Kee's nephew; founded HCJC and served as the first chairperson of its management committee from 1974 to 1996
- Quah Chin Lai, businessman and philanthropist; served as director in 1950s - 1960s.

== Notable alumni ==
=== Civil servants and politicians ===
==== Heads of State ====
- Ong Teng Cheong, fifth President of Singapore; graduated from TCHS in 1955

==== Active Singaporean Politicians ====
- Baey Yam Keng, Mayor of North East District, Senior Parliamentary Secretary in the Ministry of Sustainability and the Environment and Ministry of Transport; graduated from HCJC in 1988
- Chee Hong Tat, Minister of National Development, graduated from TCHS
- Grace Fu Hai Yien, Minister for Sustainability and the Environment and former Leader of the House; graduated from HCJC in 1981
- Koh Poh Koon, Senior Minister of State in the Ministry of Sustainability and the Environment and Ministry of Manpower (Singapore); graduated from HCJC in 1990
- K Muralidharan Pillai, former Minister of State for Transport, Minister of State for Law, MP for Jurong East-Bukit Batok GRC; graduated from HCJC in 1985
- Sim Ann, Senior Minister of State in the Ministry of National Development and Ministry of Communications and Information; graduated from HCJC in 1993
- Tin Pei Ling, MP for Marine Parade-Braddell Heights GRC; graduated from HCJC in 2001
- Tan Kiat How, Senior Minister of State in the Ministry of Digital Development and Information and Ministry of National Development
- Hazel Poa, Non-constituency Member of Parliament (NCMP)
- Denise Phua, MP for Jalan Besar GRC & Mayor of Central Singapore District
- Henry Kwek, MP for Kebun Baru SMC, graduated from TCHS
- Louis Chua, MP for Sengkang GRC
- Melvin Yong, MP for Radin Mas SMC & Assistant Secretary-General of NTUC, graduated from TCHS in 1988
- Ang Wei Neng, MP for West Coast-Jurong West GRC
- Ng Chee Meng, Member of Parliament for Jalan Kayu SMC, Minister in the Prime Minister's Office; eighth Chief of Defence Force; graduated from HCJC

==== Retired Singaporean Politicians ====
- Jek Yeun Thong, former Minister for Labour, Minister for Culture, Minister for Science and Technology, and High Commissioner to the United Kingdom and to Denmark; studied at TCHS but was expelled from school by the British colonial government in 1950
- Ker Sin Tze, former Minister of State in the Ministry of Education and Ministry of Information and the Arts
- Yeo Guat Kwang, Assistant Director-General of the National Trades Union Congress (NTUC) and former MP; graduated from TCHS in 1977
- Lee Yi Shyan, former MP for East Coast GRC; graduated from HCJC in 1980
- Sam Tan Chin Siong, former Minister of State in the Ministry of Foreign Affairs and Ministry of Social and Family Development; graduated from HCJC in 1976
- Leon Perera, former NCMP and MP for Aljunied GRC; graduated from HCJC
- Lim Wee Kiak, MP for Sembawang GRC; graduated from TCHS in 1984 and from HCJC in 1986
- Tan Wu Meng, MP for Jurong GRC, Senior Parliamentary Secretary in the Ministry of Foreign Affairs and Ministry of Trade and Industry
- Sitoh Yih Pin, MP for Potong Pasir SMC

==== Singapore Armed Forces personnel ====
- Aaron Beng Yao Cheng, current Chief of Defence Force; graduated from HCJC in 1999.
- Goh Si Hou, former Chief of the Singapore Army; graduated from HCJC in 1996.
- Hoo Cher Mou, former Chief of the Republic of Singapore Air Force (RSAF); graduated from HCJC in 1984
- Ng Chee Khern, former Chief of the RSAF; graduated from HCJC in 1983
- Ng Chee Peng, former Chief of the Republic of Singapore Navy
- Ng Yat Chung, Chief Executive Officer of Neptune Orient Lines; fifth Chief of Defence Force; graduated from HCJC in 1979
- Kelvin Khong, former Chief of the RSAF

==== Others ====
- Lim Chin Siong, trade union leader; leftist politician of the PAP and Barisan Sosialis; studied at TCHS but was expelled from school by the British colonial government in 1952
- Yam Ah Mee, former Chief Executive Director of the People's Association; former Chief of the Land Transport Authority; Returning Officer in the 2011 General Election
- Goh Meng Seng, leader of People's Power Party
- Lim Tean, Secretary-General of Peoples Voice

=== Business and entrepreneurs ===
- Shou Zi Chew, CEO of tech company TikTok.
- Calvin Cheng Ern Lee, former Nominated Member of Parliament and Chairman of Retech Group; graduated from TCHS and HCJC
- Min-Liang Tan, founder of tech company Razer.
- Olivia Lum Ooi Lin, founder of Hyflux; graduated from HCJC in the 1980s, former Nominated Member of Parliament
- Brandon Wade, founder of online dating websites; he studied at HCJC
- Wee Cho Yaw, Chairman of United Overseas Bank; studied at TCHS but his studies were disrupted by the Japanese invasion of Malaya and Singapore in 1941–1942
- Kenny Yap Kim Lee, founder of Qian Hu Corporation
- Lip-Bu Tan, chief executive officer of Intel Corporation

=== Academics, scientists and writers ===
- Chen Xujing, historian, sociologist and university administrator
- Koh Buck Song, poet, writer and journalist; graduated from HCJC
- Madeleine Lee, poet
- Colin Cheong, award winning writer
- Ho Teck Hua, professor and Provost of the National University of Singapore
- Thio Li-ann, former Nominated Member of Parliament
- Phua Kok Khoo, professor, Chairman and Editor-in-Chief of World Scientific, and founding director of the Institute of Advanced Studies at Nanyang Technological University

=== Sportspeople ===
- Benedict Tan, gold medal winner for sailing at the 1994 Asian Games and four-time SEA Games gold medalist; former Nominated Member of Parliament; medical director at the Singapore Sports Medicine Centre; graduated from HCJC
- Soh Rui Yong, long-distance runner who holds four national records in Singapore, winning gold at the SEA Games in 2017; graduated from TCHS

=== Arts, entertainment and media personalities ===
- Film, television and theatre:
  - Anthony Chen, film director; graduated from TCHS
  - Sharon Au, former MediaCorp actress; graduated from HCJC
  - Adam Chen, MediaCorp actor; graduated from TCHS and HCJC
  - Chua Lam, food critic, columnist and television personality
  - Kuo Pao Kun, playwright, theatre director and arts activist; attended TCHS in the 1950s
  - Ng Hui, MediaCorp actress; graduated from HCJC
  - Alan Tern, MediaCorp actor; graduated from TCHS and HCJC
  - Nelson Chia, co-founder of Nine Years Theatre
  - Woon Tai Ho, veteran media practitioner, TV producer, art collector and writer, founder of Channel NewsAsia
- Music
  - Bevlyn Khoo, jazz pop singer songwriter
  - Choo Huey, music conductor; graduated from TCHS in the late 1940s
  - Eric Moo Chii Yuan, singer-songwriter; studied at TCHS
  - Joel Tan, stage name Gentle Bones, singer-songwriter; graduated from HCI in 2012
  - Liang Wern Fook, music composer; graduated from HCJC
  - Lorraine Tan, singer-songwriter and founder of My Singapore Music Charity Education Project; graduated from HCJC
  - Ng Chee Yang, champion of singing contest Campus SuperStar Season 1; graduated from HCI in 2007
  - Tan Boon Wah, singer-songwriter
- Arts
  - Grace Quek, better known as Annabel Chong, web designer, artist and former pornographic actress; graduated from HCJC
  - Ho Ho Ying, expressionist painter and art critic; attended TCHS in the 1950s
  - Tan Swie Hian, artist; graduated from TCHS in 1964

=== Others ===
- Jane Lee, first woman from Southeast Asia to scale the Seven Summits; associate with McKinsey & Company; graduated from HCJC
- Lee Kin Mun, better known as mrbrown, blogger and political critic; graduated from HCJC
