= Quah Chin Lai =

Singaporean metal and machinery hardware tycoon and philanthropist

- 柯进来
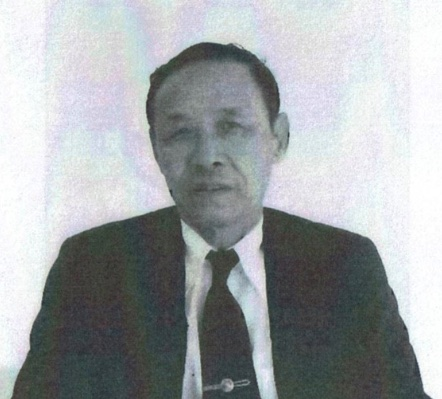
- Born: 26 November 1892; Anxi County, Fujian Province, Qing Empire
- Died: 23 December 1990 (aged 98); Singapore
- Occupation: Businessman
- Spouses: Wen Ke Niang (Chinese:溫刻娘, Wēn Kèniáng) and Yeo Peck Gim (Chinese:姚碧吟, Yáo Bìyín)

Quah Chin Lai (Kwa Chin Lai, Khua Chin Lai, simplified Chinese: 柯进来; traditional Chinese: 柯進來; pinyin: Kē Jìnlái; Pe̍h-ōe-jī: Koa Chìn-lâi) (26 November 1892 – 23 December 1990) was a Singaporean metal and machinery hardware tycoon and philanthropist.

== Early life ==
Quah was born in Fujian, China in 1892. During his youth, Quah would travel all over his township and neighboring counties to sell toys and wares. His interest in metal ware started when he was an apprentice for a blacksmith and made a career and business in blacksmithing.

== Business and career ==
In 1916, Quah traveled to Singapore and founded Hiap Leong Kee which specialized in hardware construction equipment. During the Second World War, Hiap Leong Kee was seized by the Japanese and Quah escaped to Malaysia and hid in the plantations. After the Japanese surrendered, Quah resumed the management of Hiap Leong Kee and imported European and American products. Within a few years, Hiap Leong Kee was reestablished as a leading company by Quah.

He was one of the pioneer founders of the Singapore Metal & Machinery Association in 1935 and in 1947, his company supplied a complete range of building machinery, equipments and shipping parts.

In 1954, he founded the Nanyang Kuah Si Association in Singapore and later took part in the construction and building of Nanyang University in 1955.

- Singapore Chinese Chamber of Commerce representing a member of the Singapore Trade Mission Delegation to China in 1956
- Honorary member of Ee Hoe Hean
- Honorary member of Goh Loo Club
- Honorary member of Singapore Hokkien Huay Kuan
- Honorary member of Singapore Ann Kway Association
- Director of United Overseas Bank
- Director of The Chinese High School (Singapore) (Now known as Hwa Chong Schools namely Hwa Chong Institution, Hwa Chong International and Hwa Chong Junior College) in 1950s to 1960s.
- Director of Nanyang Girls' High School

== Family ==
- Quah married Ms. Wen Ke Niang (Chinese: 溫刻娘; pinyin: WēnKèNiáng; Pe̍h-ōe-jī: Un Khek-liông) in the year 1901, in China and together they have 6 sons and 3 daughters.
- In the year 1928, Quah married Yeo Peck Gim (Chinese: 姚碧吟; pinyin: YáoBìYín; Jyutping: Jiu4 Bik1 Jam4) in Singapore as his second wife and together they have 2 sons and 4 daughters.

== Legacy ==
In recognition of Quah's contributions to society he was commemorated as follows:

- In 1999 in the book that documents Beihong in Southeast Asia (悲鸿在星洲), Quah was mention for his heroic effort rescuing Xu Beihong when the Japanese Empire invaded Singapore.
- In 2012, Quah Chin Lai was listed as among the Prominent Figures of the World Fujian Communities publication recounts the lives of some 150 Hokkien Singaporeans and records their achievements and contributions to Singapore over the past 200 years. It will be launched in November this year.
- In 2015, World Scientific published a book about "Tan Lark Sye: Advocator And Founder Of Nanyang University" for Quah was mention for his contribution to Nanyang University.
- In 2019, Quah was listed in the Singapore Biographical Database. The database presents an interface that allows users to search individual prominent Singapore Chinese personalities and displays a social network of interpersonal connections and affiliations between them. Apart from biographical information. Quah was listed in the first phase of this project focuses on 200 prominent Singapore Chinese personalities to coincide with the 200th anniversary of the founding of modern Singapore in 2019.

== Gallery ==
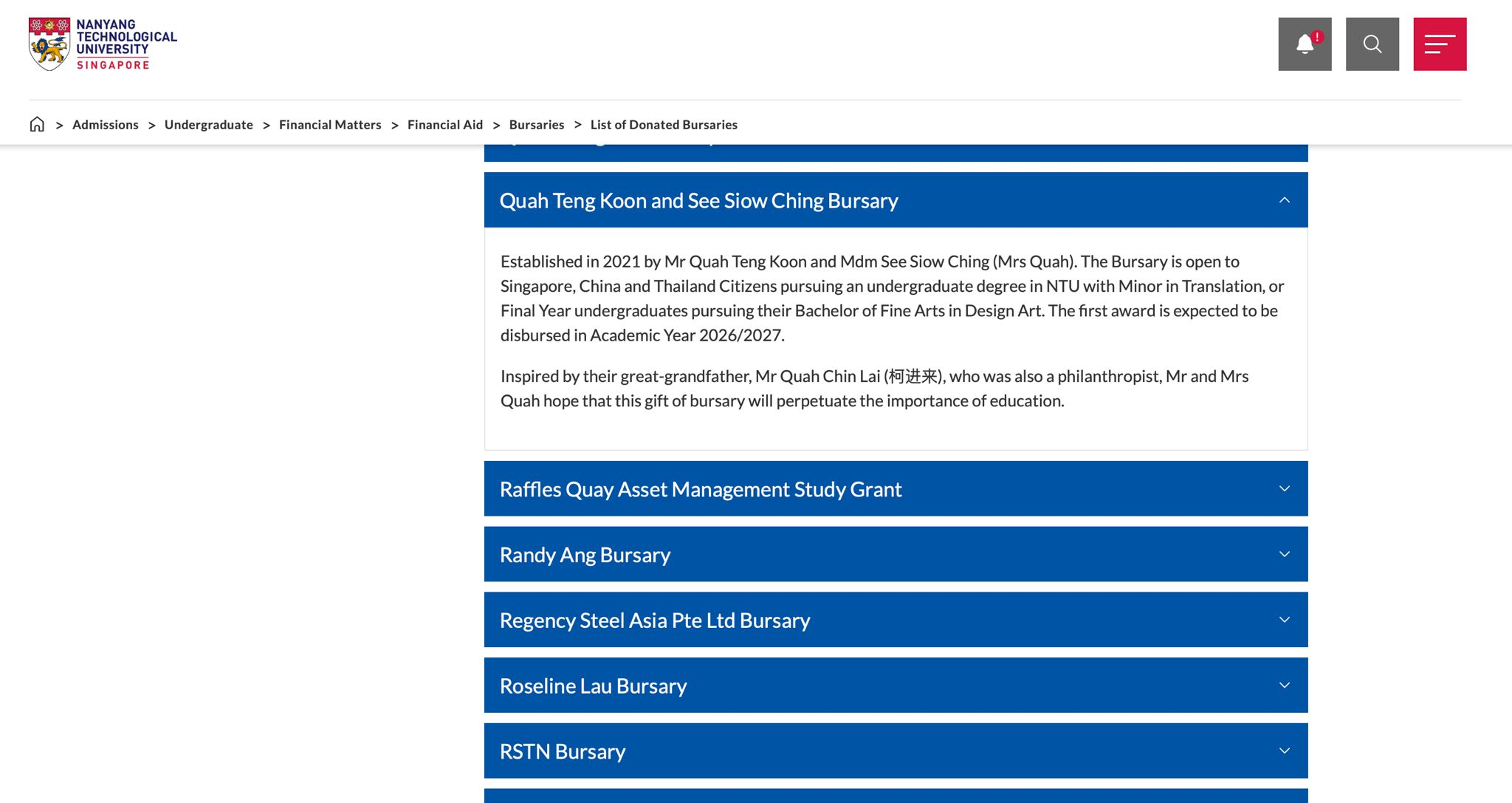
In 2021, Quah Chin Lai's eldest great-grandson (Quah Teng Koon 柯廷坤) and his wife established an educational bursary in Singapore Nanyang Technological University to continue Mr. Quah Chin Lai's philanthropic spirit to perpetuate the importance of education.

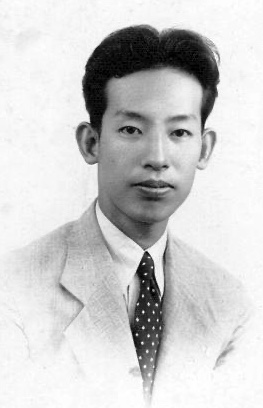
A photo of Quah Chin Lai in his early 30s

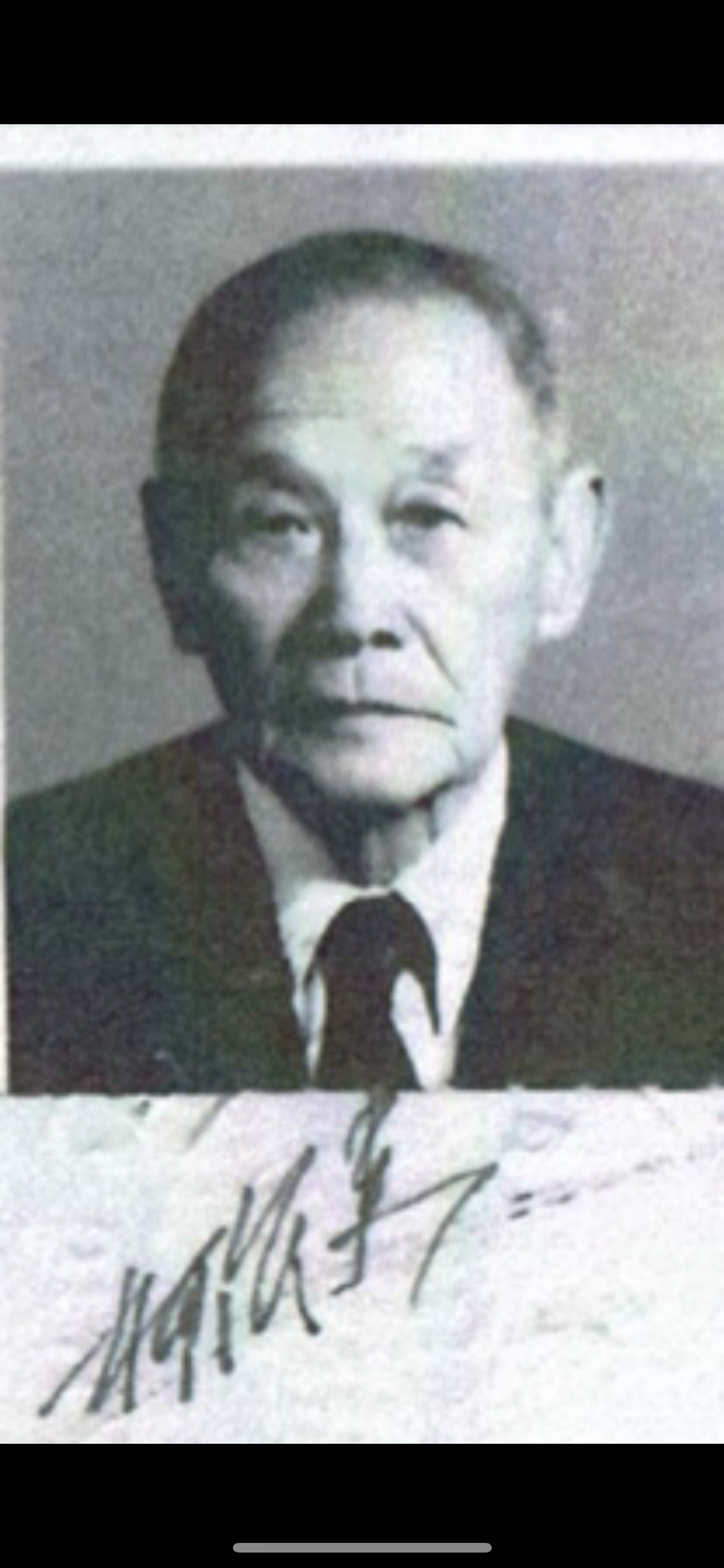
Quah Chin Lai in his 90s and his signature

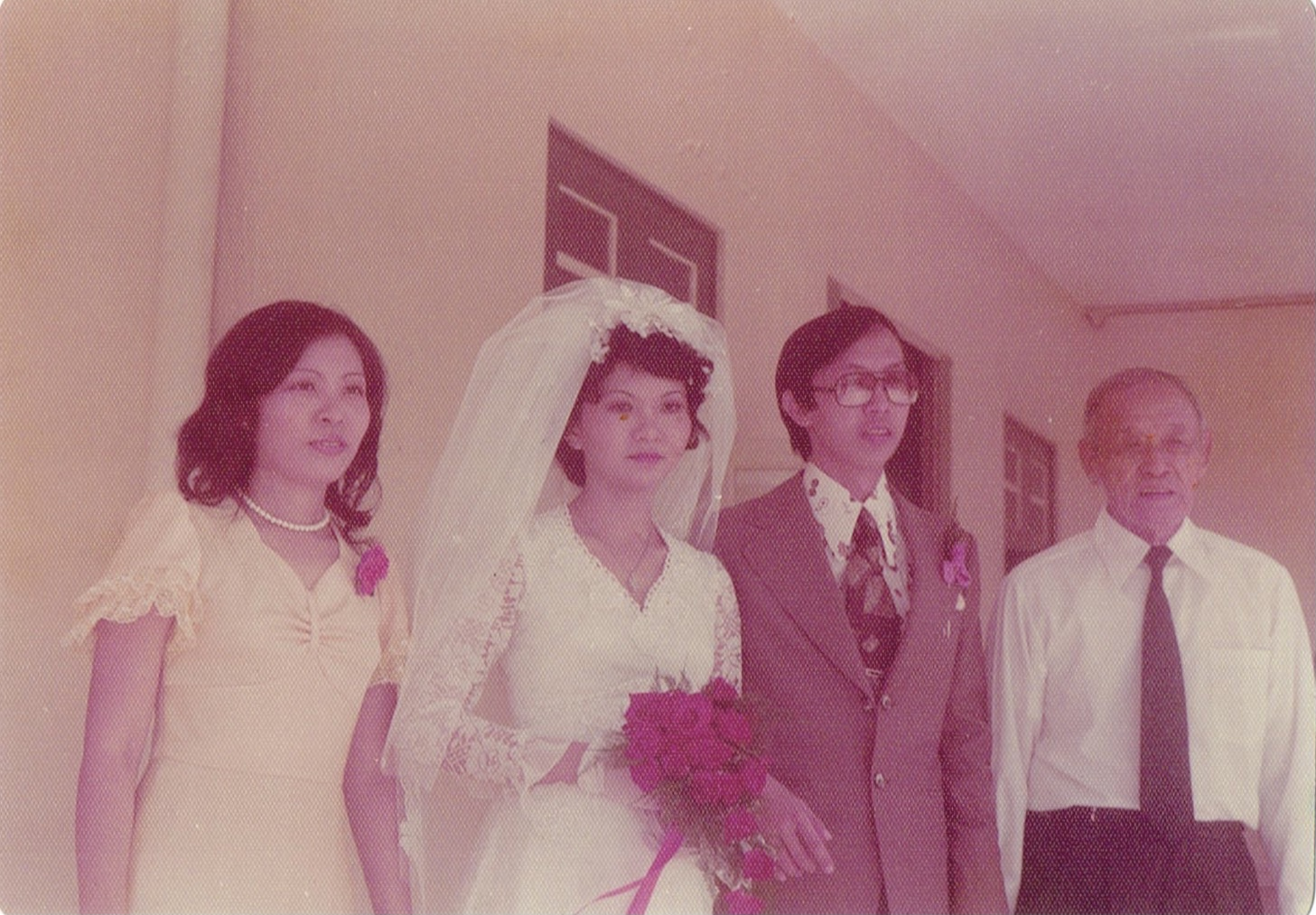
Quah Chin Lai at Eldest Grandson (Mr. Quah Chin Siong) Wedding in 1975 (Photos can be found in Singapore National Museum Archives )
