= Rescue 995 =

Singaporean television drama

- Genre: Civil Defence; Medical; Romance
- Created by: 张湄纭 Cynthia Chong
- Written by: 谢俊源 Seah Choon Guan
- Starring: Jeanette Aw; Tay Ping Hui; Pierre Png; Yvonne Lim; Ng Hui; Zhu Xiufeng
- Opening theme: Music By 郑凯华 Zheng Kai Hua
- Ending theme: 我的世界 By Lorraine Tan
- Country of origin: Singapore
- Original language: Mandarin
- No. of episodes: 20

Production
- Producer: 赖丽婷 Lai Lee Thin
- Running time: approx. 45 minutes

Original release
- Network: MediaCorp TV Channel 8
- Release: 6 February – 2 March 2012

Related
- In Safe Hands (守护星) (2022)

Rescue 995 is a 20-episode drama serial which debuted on Singapore's free-to-air Chinese language channel, MediaCorp TV Channel 8 in February 2012. It stars Jeanette Aw, Tay Ping Hui, Pierre Png, Yvonne Lim and Ng Hui as the casts of this series. It revolves around the medical industry and the life of paramedics.

This drama is sponsored by the Singapore Civil Defence Force, which has the real fire and ambulance vehicles and procedures.

There are no nominations for this drama for Star Awards 2013.

The theme song for Rescue 995 was sung and performed by Lorraine Tan in 2010 which the album is also known as 我的世界 (My World).

== Episodes ==
No.	Title	Original release date	Repeat telecast
1	"Episode 1"	February 6, 2012	April 17, 2013
2	"Episode 2"	February 7, 2012 PG	April 18, 2013 PG
3	"Episode 3"	February 8, 2012	April 19, 2013
4	"Episode 4"	February 9, 2012	April 22, 2013
5	"Episode 5"	February 10, 2012	April 23, 2013
6	"Episode 6"	February 13, 2012	April 24, 2013
7	"Episode 7"	February 14, 2012	April 25, 2013
8	"Episode 8"	February 15, 2012 PG	April 26, 2013 PG
9	"Episode 9"	February 16, 2012 PG	April 29, 2013 PG
10	"Episode 10"	February 17, 2012 PG	April 30, 2013 PG
11	"Episode 11"	February 20, 2012	May 1, 2013
12	"Episode 12"	February 21, 2012	May 2, 2013
13	"Episode 13"	February 22, 2012 PG	May 3, 2013 PG
14	"Episode 14"	February 23, 2012	May 6, 2013
15	"Episode 15"	February 24, 2012 PG	May 7, 2013 PG
16	"Episode 16"	February 27, 2012	May 8, 2013
17	"Episode 17"	February 28, 2012 PG	May 9, 2013 PG
18	"Episode 18"	February 29, 2012 PG	May 10, 2013 PG
19	"Episode 19"	March 1, 2012 PG	May 13, 2013 PG
20	"Episode 20 (Finale)"	March 2, 2012 PG	May 14, 2013 PG

== Overseas broadcast ==
Country of Broadcast	Broadcasting Network	Debut	Finale
Malaysia	Astro Shuang Xing	3 May 2012	31 May 2012
Indonesia	Indovision MediaCorp Channel 8		
