= Tiong Bahru Secondary School =

School in Singapore

Coordinates: 1.289062°N 103.825258°E

Tiong Bahru Secondary School (TBSS, 立道中学), established in 1966 and merged with Delta Secondary School in 1991, was one of the first bilingual integrated (混合中学) secondary schools built after Singapore Independence (August 9, 1965). It had both Chinese and English streams, attracting students from nearby primary schools in Tiong Bahru, Bukit Ho Swee and Delta Road areas.

== History ==
The school was established in 1966, during a period when then Singapore Minister for Education Ong Pang Boon was establishing bilingualism (中/英双语) in schools. The opening ceremony was held on June 3, 1967.

The first principal was Ngui Jim Chiang (1966-1970), a former World War II lieutenant, who was succeeded by a former Raffles Institution head of department in chemistry, Chung Chee Sang (1971 - 1978).

On June 6, 1976, then Prime Minister Lee Kuan Yew planted an Angsana tree at the school during a visit as part of the "Use Your Hands" campaign.

As the population in the Tiong Bahru / Bukit Ho Swee neighbourhood was aging, and the younger generation families moving out, the school's student enrollment dropped after the late 1980s. The school closed in 1991, merging with its neighbour, Bukit Ho Swee Secondary School (立达中学) to form Delta Secondary School, and subsequently in 2004 all were grouped under Bukit Merah Secondary School.

The vacated campus was once used as the temporary administrative head office of Nanyang Polytechnic, and is now the Singapore Examinations and Assessment Board's Tiong Bahru Examinations Centre.

== Academics ==
The 1971 graduated batch produced top GCE O-level students in Singapore, five of whom went on to the country's then only junior college, National Junior College (国家初级学院), and thereafter one student won the prestigious Public Service Commission Overseas Merit Scholarship (to France).

== Athletics and extracurricular activities ==
The school’s sports activities included mountain climbing and basketball, and it was reported to be the first school from Singapore to undertake a climb of Mount Kinabalu.

The school's first brass band was formed in 1969, and within three years it placed in the Top 20 (11th place) in the Singapore Youth Festival Brass Band Competition.

== Notable alumni ==
- Olivia Lum: Founder and CEO, Hyflux
