= This I Promise You (disambiguation) =

This I Promise You most commonly refers to:

- "This I Promise You", a 2000 song by American boy band NSYNC

This I Promise You may also refer to:

== Other songs ==
- "This I Promise You", by Marie Osmond from Who's Sorry Now, 1975
- "This I Promise You", by Ronan Keating from Bring You Home, 2006
- "This I Promise You", by Shola Ama with D'Influence and D-Vas from Supersonic, 2002
- "This I Promise You", by Lorraine Tan, 2017
- "This I Promise You", by The Five Keys, 1957
- "This I Promise You", by Top Combine, 2010

== Other works ==
- This I Promise You, a 2023 TV series starring Oabnithi Wiwattanawarang
