= Olivia Lum =

Singaporean businesswoman

- Born: 1961 (age 64–65); Kampar, Perak, Federation of Malaya
- Citizenship: Singapore
- Education: National University of Singapore
- Occupations: Group CEO & President, Hyflux Group of Companies

Chinese name
- Traditional Chinese: 林愛蓮
- Simplified Chinese: 林爱莲
Transcriptions
Standard Mandarin
- Hanyu Pinyin: Lín Àilián
Yue: Cantonese
- Yale Romanization: Làhm Oilìhn
- Jyutping: Lam^{4} Oi^{3} Lin^{4}
Southern Min
- Hokkien POJ: Lîm Ài-liân
- Tâi-lô: Lîm Ài-liân

Olivia Lum Ooi Lin is a Singaporean businesswoman. She is the founder, group chief executive officer, and former president of the Singapore-based Hyflux Group.

== Early life ==
Lum was adopted at birth, and never knew her biological parents; she was brought up by a woman she called her "grandmother". When Lum was only three, her grandmother gambled away her savings; they lost the house in which they were living, and moved to a shack without running water. She came to Singapore at the age of 15 and enrolled at the Tiong Bahru Secondary School, where she supported herself through tutoring and sales jobs. She went on to study at Hwa Chong Junior College and graduated in 1986 with an Honours degree in chemistry from the Faculty of Science of the National University of Singapore.

== Career ==
Lum started corporate life as a chemist with Glaxo Pharmaceutical. After working for three years at Glaxo, she left in 1989 at the age of 28 to start up Hydrochem, the precursor to Hyflux, with just SG$20,000 of capital, which she raised by selling her condominium and car. She hired three employees at the start; Lum herself rode around on a motorcycle selling her company's water filters and treatment chemicals. By January 2001, Hyflux had become the first water treatment company to be listed on SESDAQ, and was upgraded to the Singapore Exchange's Mainboard in April 2003.

In 2002, Lim won the Her World Woman award of the Year for her contributions to Singaporean water. She was also a Nominated Member of Parliament for a single term from 2002 to 2004.

By 2005, she had a net worth of over US$240 million, which earned her a place as the only woman on Forbes' "Southeast Asia Rich List".

Lum holds several positions in public service. She is a board member of SPRING Singapore, the National University Singapore Council, and the Singapore Exchange, as well as the president of the Singapore Water Association. She is also a member of the UNESCAP Business Advisory Council and the Singapore Green Plan 2012 coordinating committee. Lum was a Nominated Member of Parliament in the Parliament of Singapore from 2 July 2002 to 1 January 2005. In 2003, she was awarded the International Management Action Award, followed by the Global Female Invent and Innovate Award the following year.

On 3 October 2008, Lum resigned her position as independent non-executive director of the Singapore Exchange and relinquished her position on the audit, regulatory conflicts and remuneration committees of the Exchange, according to the Exchange's filing. She stated this was due to her heavy work commitments in line with Hyflux's rapid expansion, and that her resignation would enable her to focus more time and resources on Hyflux's growth.

In 2011, Lum was named Ernst & Young World Entrepreneur Of The Year and was the first woman to win the award.

In 2013, Lum was appointed to the board at International Enterprise Singapore.

In 2014 Lum was appointed the board of Singapore Technologies Engineering. She was also inducted into the Singapore Women's Hall of Fame

In 2016, Lum became a laureate of the Asian Scientist 100 by the Asian Scientist.

In 2018, Lum resigned from the board of ST Engineering (previously known as Singapore Technologies Engineering) citing business commitments as her reason for resignation.

In May 2018, Hyflux applied to the Singapore High Court for a 30-day protection against creditor claims to allow the company time to reorganize its liabilities. Following this voluntary filing, Lum announced a series of three townhall meetings with the company's 50,000 plus retail shareholders. In July, Lum announced that efforts would be made to “ensure that the company stays viable.” Lum also noted that Hyflux had total debt of $1.17 billion.

In December 2022, it was reported that Hyflux was claiming damages exceeding S$690.6 million from Lum in a civil lawsuit alleging negligence and breach of fiduciary duty.

== Criminal Charges ==
On 17 November 2022, Lum, ex-CFO Cho Wee Peng and four other former board members were charged with violations of Singapore's Securities and Futures Act. On 5 May 2023, Singapore's State Court added three additional charges against Lum, citing violations of the Companies Act related to an allegation that she failed to exercise diligence in the discharge of her duties as a director. Lum faces a potential jail term of up to two years, a maximum fine of S$150,000, or both.
