= Liew Yuen Sien =

Chinese-born Singaporean educator

- 刘韵仙;
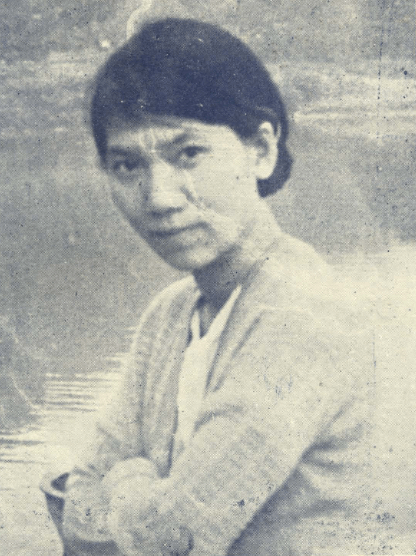
- Liew c. 1935
- Born: Liu Xiangying; 1901; Jiangxi, China
- Died: 1975 (aged 74-75); Singapore
- Education: Yenching University
- Occupation: Educator
- Relatives: Grace Fu (granddaughter)
- Honours: Order of the British Empire

Liew Yuen Sien (Chinese: 刘韵仙; pinyin: Liú Yùnxiān; 1901–1975) was a Chinese-born Singaporean educator. She served from 1927 to 1966 as principal of Nanyang Girls' High School (NYGH), an all-girls school in Singapore. An active proponent of improving the quality of Chinese education and women's education across Southeast Asia and China, she was awarded the Order of the British Empire in 1958 and the Singaporean Presidential Medal in 1967.

== Personal life ==
Liew was born Liu Xiangying (刘相英) in Jiangxi Province, China and was the only child of a wealthy family. She graduated from Fuxiang Middle School (福湘中学) in Changsha, taught at Sanyu School (三育学校) in Xiangtan, before studying at Yenching University in Beijing.

In 1928, Liew married Fu Wumen, who renamed her Liew Yuen Sien, as he felt that she was much like a fairy.

== Career ==
In 1927, Liew was appointed principal of Nanyang Girls’ High School—then known as Singapore Nanyang Girls’ School. At the time, the school offered only primary education. Significant contributions that Liew made include funding the studies of women to encourage parents to send their daughters to school even after they were married, as well as making frequent trips to China to hire new teachers and to observe the teaching methods there. As the girls in Nanyang previously communicated in dialect, Liew reinforced the use of Mandarin by instituting that no one was to speak in dialect else they would be fined. The students were also required to speak English during English lessons, and Liew went as far as to hire Indian English teachers so that the girls could not converse with them in Mandarin.

Despite her strict educational policies, Liew was liberal and open in other areas. As noted by alumna Dr. Lau Wai Har, “If any of the students fell in love but met with parental objections or were forced into arranged marriages, Mdm Liew would step in to help, allowing them to marry the person they loved.”

In 1930, Liew spearheaded efforts to create the Primary School Examination Standard, along with the Principal of the Chinese Industrial & Commercial Continuation School Mr Lin Ze Yang and the Fujian Clan Association Education Head Mr Huang Xiao Yan. Primary six examinations were thus standardized across five Chinese schools in Singapore, and the number of participating schools gradually increased over the years. A few years later, British colonial authorities took over the administration of these tests as they decided that the exams touched on “politically sensitive” topics.

Under Liew's leadership, Nanyang Girls' flourished and its student population grew. In February 1931, the school moved to a new campus on King's Road in Bukit Timah to cope with the increased student population. The school also started offering secondary education in the same year and was officially renamed Nanyang Girls’ High School. By August 1931, there were around 400 students enrolled in the school.

In 1939, Kindergarten classes were introduced, a pre-tertiary section was established, and the school's primary and secondary sections were separated. Liew also gave the school its motto, “Diligence, Prudence, Respectability, Simplicity” (勤慎端朴).

In 1941, Nanyang closed down due to the outbreak of the Pacific War. The school building was taken over by the British military, and was subsequently used by the Japanese as a military hospital. When the war ended in 1945, Liew returned from Cameron Highlands where she sought refuge, and worked tirelessly with the alumni to resume school operations. In 1947, Liew requested a $200,000 compensation from the government for damages incurred during the war, and it was only in 1952 that the government responded by giving the school $68,000. Nonetheless, Nanyang was the only Chinese school in Singapore that received compensation from the government.

By 1946, Nanyang Girls’ was one of the largest Chinese schools in Singapore, with an estimated enrolment of 1,400 students. Liew would often proudly proclaim, “We are the top girls’ school in Singapore and British Malaya.”

Liew retired on 31 December 1966, after forty years of serving as Principal of Nanyang Girls’ High School.

== Attack by Communist Youths ==
On the morning of 16 October 1951, Liew was walking to work when a group of Chinese Communist sympathizers threw a toxic solution of nitric acid on her. She suffered severe chemical burns on her body, including on her face, eyes, neck, chest, and arms. Liew struggled to recover under hospital care and eventually sought treatment in Australia and America. During this time, discipline mistress Low Pei Kim took over as acting principal. It was not until August 1954 that Liew was able to return to work.

One source speculates that the crime was an act of retribution by Communists radicals for her cooperation with the British colonial authorities against them. In the book Schooling Diaspora: Women, Education, and the Overseas Chinese in British Malaya and Singapore, 1850s-1960s, Karen M. Teoh wrote:

“The attack on Liew Yuen Sien emerged from the collision of political issues within the overseas Chinese community of Southeast Asia: China’s quest for national modernization; female education as a key component of this quest; and overseas Chinese efforts to live within an unstable matrix of national, diasporic, and colonial demands… [Liew] was hailed by much of the Chinese community as an active contributor to their welfare but also strongly criticized by some of her co-ethnics for her acquiescence to British anti-Communist pressure.”

The acid attack on Liew took place during the Malayan Emergency of 1948–1960. During this time, Communist insurgents who were previously focused on resisting the Japanese Occupation during World War II turned their attention towards fighting British imperialism. Nanyang became a hotbed for youth Communist activity during this period, and was forced by colonial authorities to close down in 1951. It was only after Liew agreed to disband political student organizations and shut down school dormitories that the school was allowed to continue operations. For the next few years, the school had to constantly negotiate conflicting demands between the student body and the colonial authorities, causing much tension between the staff and students, and in some cases resulting in attacks on teachers.

== Accolades ==
Recognitions and accolades that she received include: The Chinese Nationalist government award in 1940, an Order of the British Empire in 1958, and a Singaporean presidential medal in 1967. There is also a bronze bust of Liew erected in NYGH to honour her contributions to the school.

== Personal life ==
Liew was the grandmother of Grace Fu, a minister in the Singapore government.
