= Tan Keong Choon =

Tan Keong Choon BBM
- 陳共存
- Tan in 2011
- Born: 2 November 1918; Jimei, Tong'an County, Fujian Province, Republic of China
- Died: 27 October 2015 (aged 96); Gleneagles Hospital, Tanglin, Singapore
- Education: Xiamen University
- Occupation: Businessman
- Known for: Philanthropic work; Supporting education in Singapore
- Relatives: Tan Kah Kee

Tan Keong Choon
- Traditional Chinese: 陳共存
- Simplified Chinese: 陈共存
Transcriptions
Standard Mandarin
- Hanyu Pinyin: Chén Gòngcún

Tan Keong Choon BBM (Chinese: 陳共存; pinyin: Chén Gòngcún; 2 November 1918 – 27 October 2015) was a Chinese industrialist, community leader and philanthropist in Singapore. He is noted for his contributions to Singapore's development and support to the local Chinese community.

== Early life and education ==
Tan pursued Historical Studies in Xiamen University in 1935, and moved with his mother to Singapore in 1937 due to Japanese invasion of China. After which, he pursued education in Singapore, Kunming, Hong Kong, and Jinan University in Shanghai up till the full outbreak of war in the Asia Pacific region.

== Business career ==
Tan entered business industry in 1940, at the age of 22.

Tan was managing director of National Iron and Steel Mills Limited, he pioneered a wage scheme where workers were paid a basic wage, and received extra wages for extra work done. He also led a successful campaign against the shipping cartel which had agreed on set freight rates over the shipping routes from Singapore. He and Tan Eng Joo were instrumental in enabling rubber merchants to continue exporting using shippers who were not part of the cartel, thereby saving the rubber industry in Singapore.

Tan also played an important role in introducing innovative rubber processing methods which met the requirements of the Standard Malaya Rubber, thus raising demand for quality rubber exports from Singapore.

== Public service ==
Tan served as the chairman of the Singapore Chinese Chamber of Commerce and Industry (SCCCI) from 1951 to 1987, and served as vice-chairman of Singapore Hokkien Huay Kuan. He served as the Chairman of the National Parks Board and the Science Centre Singapore, and was awarded the Bintang Bakti Masyarakat (Public Service Star) and subsequently the Public Service Star (Bar) for his dedicated service to the nation.

== Education service ==
Tan headed the management committee for The Chinese High School and Hwa Chong Junior College for 26 years since appointment in 1971. Under his leadership, both institutions developed and transformed greatly into one of Singapore's top high schools and junior colleges respectively.

Tan was one of the key leaders that ensured the successful integration of Nanyang University and University of Singapore into the current National University of Singapore, despite opposing the decision of the merger.

== Personal life ==
Tan suffered a stroke and had respiratory issues in 2012. Tan died in Gleneagles Hospital on 27 October 2015. A simple funeral ceremony was conducted.
