= Nanyang Girls' High School =

- 南洋女子中学校

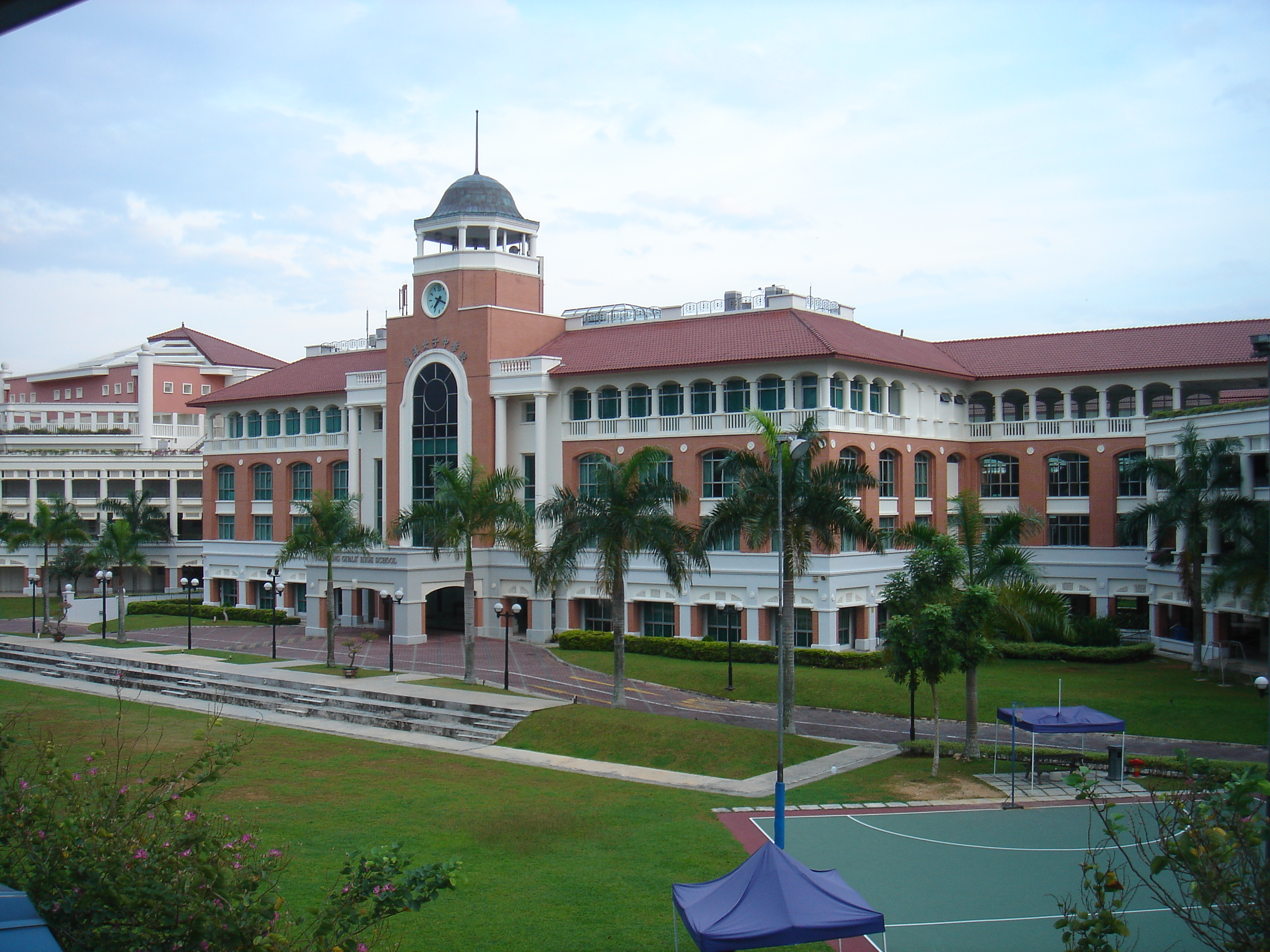

Location
- 2 Linden Drive, Singapore 288683; 1.3305°N 103.8024°E

Information
- Type: Independent; Special Assistance Plan (SAP); Integrated Programme (IP)
- Motto: 勤·慎·端·朴 (Diligence, Prudence, Respectability, Simplicity)
- Established: 1917; 109 years ago
- Session: Single session
- School code: 7114
- Principal: Siau Fong Fui
- Enrolment: ~1600
- Colour: Blue Yellow White
- Affiliations: Nanyang Primary School; Hwa Chong Institution (IP)
- Website: en.nygh.moe.edu.sg

Nanyang Girls' High School (NYGH) is an independent girls' secondary school in Bukit Timah, Singapore. Founded in 1917, it is one of the oldest schools in the country. NYGH offers a six-year Integrated Programme, which allows students to skip the Singapore-Cambridge GCE Ordinary Level examinations and proceed to take the Singapore-Cambridge GCE Advanced Level examinations at the end of Year 6. Students would study in NYGH from Years 1 through 4, before proceeding to the College section of Hwa Chong Institution in Years 5 and 6.

== History ==
=== Founding ===
NYGH was founded in 1917 as the Singapore Nanyang Girls' School by Tan Chor Lam, Teo Eng Hock. The first principal was Yu Pei Gao, and its first premises was a shophouse at 7 Dhoby Ghaut.

In 1921, Yu Pei Gao resigned as principal and six principals took occupancy of the post over a short period of time.

Lee Chin Tien, the chairman of the school's board of directors, and Liew Yuen Sien, the principal, developed the school further in 1927. The school was renamed Nanyang Girls' High School in 1930 and began operations at its new premises at King's Road in Bukit Timah the next year. The school system was altered to provide three-year Junior Middle and Senior Middle School courses.

During World War II, the school premises were taken over by the British military and became a field office. The Japanese military took control of the school premises during the Battle of Singapore in 1942 and caused great damage to its facilities.

=== Post-war development ===
After the war ended in 1945, the school's board of management, teachers, students and alumni worked together to rebuild the school and resume operations at the YMCA Building on Selegie Road.

In 1957, NYGH was chosen for the NJH Face Aided School Scheme. Subsequently, Nanyang Kindergarten began operating independently in 1960 as the Government-Aided School Scheme excluded the school's kindergarten section.

In 1978, the primary section of the school gained autonomy and became a separate but affiliated school, Nanyang Primary School.

=== Attainment of SAP status ===
In 1979, NYGH was designated as a Special Assistance Plan school, in which English and Chinese were offered as first-language subjects. The school was the first to implement the Art Elective Programme for artistically proficient students in 1984. NYGH became an independent school in 1993 and started offering the Gifted Education Programme in 1999. It moved to a new campus at Linden Drive on 6 June 1999. The school's chairperson, Ling Siew May, officiated the ceremony. Nanyang Girls' Boarding School on Linden Drive began operating in December 1999.

=== Launch of Integrated Programme ===
In 2005, the school began the six-year Integrated Programme in partnership with Hwa Chong Institution to enable academically able students to skip the Singapore-Cambridge GCE Ordinary Level examinations and proceed to take the Singapore-Cambridge GCE Advanced Level examinations at the end of Year 6.

In 2013, NYGH became the first girls' school in Singapore to be conferred the Singapore Quality Award (SQA). It was also named an Apple Distinguished School in 2015.

Nanyang Girls' High School introduced the Humanities Programme (HP) in 2008, training students who are identified to be talented in the humanities. HP students are offered Advanced Literature, Advanced Geography and Advanced History as well as the opportunity to participate in national and international humanities-based competitions and projects. Such competitions include the Humanities and Social Science Research Programme (HSSRP), Moot Parliament Programme (MPP), Leadership Development Programme (LDP) and various Model United Nations conferences (MUN).

The Science and Math Talent Program (SMTP) was introduced in 2009, for students who are gifted in Sciences and Mathematics. They are offered the Stanford EPGY Mathematics Course as part of the program.

In 2014, it initiated the Strategic Educational Alliance of Southeast Asia (SEA2) with nine other founding schools from Singapore, Malaysia, Indonesia, the Philippines, Brunei, Vietnam, and Thailand, and hosted the inaugural three-day regional conference learning journey at NYGH."Strategic Educational Alliance of South East Asia (SEA2)". Fitzgabriel Schools. 8 May 2020.

== Principals ==
| Name | Years served |
|---|---|
| Yu Pei Gao (余佩皋) | 1917 - 1921 |
| Liew Yuen Sien | 1927 - 1967 |
| Low Pei Kim (刘佩金) | 1967 - 1977 |
| Chua Liang (蔡亮) | 1977 - 1995 |
| Ng-Gan Lay Choo (颜丽珠) | 1995 - 2001 |
| Mak Lai Ying (麦丽英) | 2001 - 2006 |
| Yap Wah Choo (叶华珠) | 2006 - 2009 |
| Heng Boey Hong (王梅凤) | 2010 - 2017 |
| Ng Chuen-Yin (黄君颖) | 2018 - 2022 |
| Siau Fong Fui (萧芳辉) | 2023–present |

== School culture and identity ==
The first school logo of NYGH was a diamond-shaped motif with the school's name in Chinese printed in white against a light blue background. It was designed by Chen Jun Wen, an art teacher at the school.

In 1968, the diamond-shaped motif was superimposed on top of a yellow ring emblem with the words "Nanyang Girls' High" printed on it. The ring emblem was positioned above a yellow banner printed with the school motto, in Chinese. The school motto Qín Shèn Duān Pŭ (勤·慎·端·朴) means "Diligence, Prudence, Respectability and Simplicity".

== Affiliation ==
NYGH is a partner school of Hwa Chong Institution, which was formed in 2005 by the merger of the former Hwa Chong Junior College and The Chinese High School. The two schools frequently conduct joint programmes and activities, such as the annual Combined Sports Meet. NYGH is also affiliated with Nanyang Primary School and Nanyang Kindergarten, which are part of the Nanyang family of schools. Despite their names, Nanyang Junior College and Nanyang Polytechnic are not affiliated with NYGH or NYPS.

== Campus ==
The campus at 2 Linden Drive (off Dunearn Road) has an area of 36,400 square metres and can accommodate about 1,700 students. It is divided into nine blocks.

=== Nanyang Girls' Boarding School ===
Nanyang Girls' Boarding School provides activities such as formal dinners, enrichment, performances and sports. They also benefit from cultural exchange with boarders from Malaysia, Indonesia, Thailand, Vietnam and China.

The school is able to house a maximum of 500 boarders in 190 rooms comprising 2-4 bedded units, air-conditioned and non-air-conditioned.

== Academic Information ==
=== Bi-cultural Studies Programme (BSP) ===
The Bicultural Studies Programme (BSP) is taken by students under the Special Assistance Plan Scholarship, which is offered by the Ministry of Education to encourage outstanding students who have the interest and capacity to engage both western and eastern cultures and contemporary society.

== Co-curricular activities ==
NYGH has around 39 co-curricular activities (CCAs) for the students. The activities consist of sports, performing arts, clubs and societies and uniformed groups. Students undergo rigorous training and practices in preparation for any competitions or performances depending on the CCA.

The school has done well in the past years, repeatedly clinching titles in sports championships in inter-school competitions. The school also excels in the performing arts. In the 2011 Singapore Youth Festival, NYGH clinched eight Gold With Honours and one Silver for its nine performing arts CCA in total (Gold with Honours: Choir, Chinese Dance, Chinese Orchestra, Guzheng, Modern Dance, Chinese Drama, String Ensemble, Theatre; Silver: Band). Students of the school's Infocomm Club often take part in infocomm-related competitions, winning prizes in various competitions such as RoboFest, Robocup Singapore Open, Code Xtreme, National Software Competition and the School Digital Media Awards.

NYGH's Uniformed Groups CCAs, namely Girl Guides, National Police Cadet Corps and St. John Ambulance Brigade are also available.

The Nanyang Debate Club won runner-up at The Arena, a televised national debate competition as well as in 2008's Julia Gabriel's Debate Competition. Also, they have emerged as Champions in Hwa Chong Debate Invitationals and done reasonably well at the recent NUS Challenge Shield 2009. Three speakers from the team in the Victoria Junior College Invitationals have been ranked in the Top 5 Best Individual Speakers, with one clinching the Overall Individual Best Speaker award.

The Nanyang Chinese Debate Club has also done well since the club started operation in 2006. NYGH is the two-time champion of the annual Chinese Debating Championships, first in 2007 and in 2012. It is also the only school in Singapore to have obtained the Chinese Debate Championship title twice.

Nanyang is also home to Nanyang Dragon and Lion Dance Troupe cum 24 Drums Ensemble. The troupe started operation as a CCA when it left the National Police Cadet Corps in 2007. They hold annual caiqings during the Chinese New Year where they go around Singapore performing, and also take part in lion dance competitions.

== Awards and Accolades ==
A group of five 17-year-old students topped the secondary school category of the National Science Experiment Big Data Challenge 2017.

Sandra Teng Chin Yang received a Teaching Award in 2016, which honours outstanding teachers of English language, English literature and General Paper in Singapore.

The school clinched the Singapore Quality Award for Business Excellence award in 2013.

== Notable alumni ==
- Grace Fu, Cabinet minister
- Yu-Foo Yee Shoon, former minister of state and member of parliament
- Cynthia Chua, founder and CEO of Spa Esprit Group
- Tang Pui Wah, 1952 track and field Olympian
- Elizabeth Yin, 2012 sailing Olympian
- Goh Soo Khim, co-founder and artistic director of the Singapore Dance Theatre and Cultural Medallion winner
- Susan Long, The Straits Times senior correspondent
- Tung Soo Hua, Mediacorp news presenter
- Jamie Yeo, television presenter and actress
- Kaira Gong, Mandopop singer
