= Lorraine Tan =

Singaporean singer-songwriter

- 陈莉芯
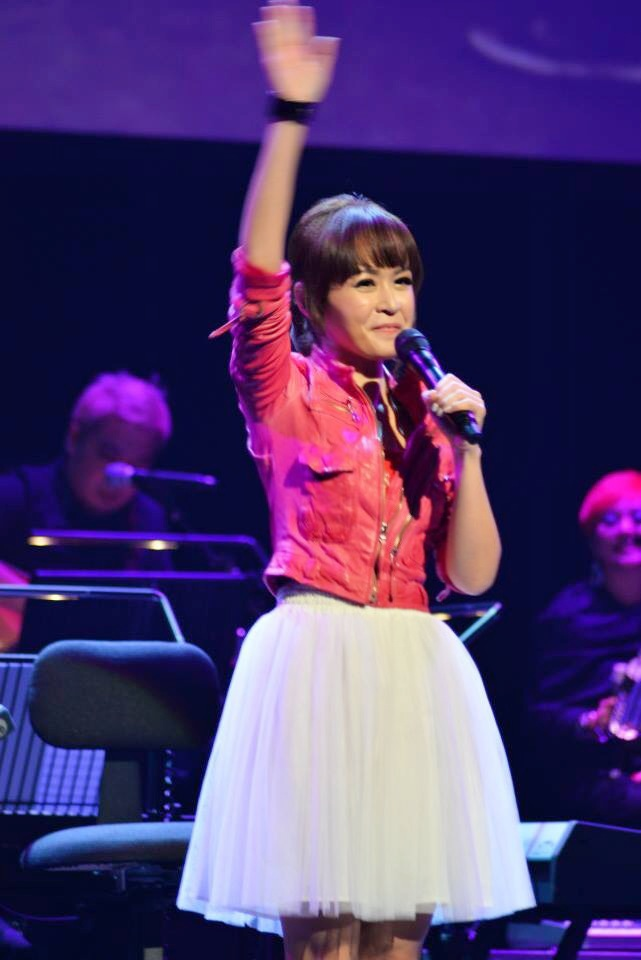
- Occupations: Singer, songwriter, producer, director, educator
- Years active: 2012 - present

Lorraine Tan (陈莉芯) is a Singaporean singer, songwriter, entrepreneur, educator and founder of the My Singapore Music Charity Movement.

== Early life ==
Tan graduated from CHIJ Saint Nicholas Girls' School and Hwa Chong Junior College. She later graduated from the Nanyang Technological University of Singapore as a civil engineer. Tan was the valedictorian of civil engineering in NTU. She also won the best speaker award in the Dorothy Cheung Debating championship in NTU. She was also trained in vocals and piano (ABRSM grade 8, distinction), and later in music education (Post graduate diploma, distinction; from NIE - National Institute of Education) to teach music. Tan also took contemporary vocal master classes at New York University in 2017.

== Music career ==
Tan started composing in 2000. Her first composition "Dreams" won the First Prize in an NUS song writing competition. She has written more than 200 songs to date for corporate companies, wedding couples, government agencies and National day charity projects. She has also performed in more than 800 events.

She then released two albums, Tan in Original Love Stories Volume 1 & 2, which compiled the songs she had written, back in 2006 and 2008 respectively. The albums primarily catered to her network of wedding, corporate clients and their friends.

In April 2014, Tan was selected as the "Kindness Ambassador" for The Singapore Kindness Movement. She wrote and sang the theme song titled "Kindness is in Me" to promote kindness and a more loving and caring society. This song can also be found on YouTube.

In August 2014, she continued to lend her creative talents to the community and charity by writing her 4th National Day Song "Moments of Love". This time she also wrote the script and directed the Music video. The three short stories in the music video depicts the different type of love that we experience in our lives. It serves as motivation to people who are suffering and sends a message that there are people out there who care for them. This video was also well-received and crossed more than 225,000 views within a month of release.

The My Singapore Project ended on a high note on 12 August 2014 with a music concert for 3,500 people at The Star Performing Arts Centre with The President of Singapore Tony Tan Keng Yam as the Guest of Honour. This concert was once again presented by CapitaLand Hope Foundation. The project raised more than SGD$200,000 for the 64 charities under President's Challenge 2014. More than 300 students from different schools in Singapore also participated in this project.

She released her first "My Singapore: Original Theme Songs DVD" and is preparing to release the "My Singapore: Concert DVD". She was also commissioned by West Spring Primary School to compose and produce their school song.

As part of SG50 (Singapore's 50th golden jubilee celebrations), Tan wrote "Snow Flower" as a tribute to the country's 50 years of dreams, aspirations and resilience. The song was inspired by Lee Kuan Yew - Singapore's founding Prime Minister. Lee died on 23 March 2015 at age 92. The music, words and images are a metaphorical interpretation of how Singapore (akin to a fragile flower), survived and thrived in difficult and seeming impossible circumstances (akin to wintry snow).

The official beneficiary of My Singapore 2015 is Beyond Social Services, whose mission is to curb delinquency among children and youths from less privileged backgrounds. The music video was filmed in Singapore and Australia, music production was done in Korea.

In 2017, Lorraine collaborated with Joseph Schooling, Singapore's first Olympic gold medalist for swimming) for her new single release "Once in a Lifetime" a motivational song to raise support and awareness for athletes who defy all odds to pursue their greatest sporting goals every day. Shortly after shooting the "Once in a Lifetime" Music Video, Lorraine went to New York University to attend the contemporary vocal master classes and performed "Once in a Lifetime" at the final day concert in New York University with 39 other students selected to join the program from all over the world. Subsequently, on 30 August 2017, Lorraine was invited by Esplanade to hold a music concert to perform her original compositions as part of the Red Dot August program to promote Singaporean music. Performing with her were 6 musicians and children guests artistes from West Spring Primary school and others.

In 2017 Dec, Lorraine performed in her first musical - The ETCeteras' 23rd production, Sole Mate《同鞋会》at Victoria Theatre, which explores the hidden pains, desires and struggles beneath the pretty soles of women. She played one of the lead actress: a down-in-love-and-luck but positive and quirky music teacher, "Miss Tan", along with Apple Hong and Tay Sia Yuen. The play featured Lorraine's four original songs (all sang live): 最幸福的感动，我的世界，灰色的结， This I Promise You. In particular, 灰色的结 was a new single specially written and composed by Lorraine for this musical.
