= Hwa Chong Junior College =

Junior college in Singapore

- 华中初级学院; Huázhōng Chūjí Xuéyuàn

Location
- 661 Bukit Timah Road, Singapore 269734; Bukit Timah; Singapore; 1.32654°N 103.803491°E

Information
- Type: Independent
- Motto: 力求進步 (Towards Progress)
- Established: 15 January 1974; 52 years ago
- Founder: Tan Keong Choon
- Status: Merged with The Chinese High School to form Hwa Chong Institution
- Closed: 1 January 2005; 21 years ago
- Colour: Red Yellow
- Vision: Live with Passion, Lead with Compassion

Hwa Chong Junior College
- Simplified Chinese: 华中初级学院
- Traditional Chinese: 華中初級學院
Transcriptions
Standard Mandarin
- Hanyu Pinyin: Huázhōng Chūjí Xuéyuàn
- Wade–Giles: Hua^{2}-chung^{1} Ch'u^{1}-chi^{2} Hsüeh^{2}-yüan^{4}

The Hwa Chong Junior College (Chinese: 华中初级学院; pinyin: Huázhōng Chūjí Xuéyuàn) was a junior college in Singapore offering pre-university education. The school merged with The Chinese High School on 1 January 2005 to form the integrated Hwa Chong Institution (HCI).

== History ==
=== Founding ===
Hwa Chong Junior College is the second junior college, and the first government-aided junior college to be established in Singapore, after National Junior College. In 1970, the then Minister for Education Ong Pang Boon approached a group of Chinese community leaders from the Singapore Chinese Chamber of Commerce and Industry (SCCCI) to discuss establishing ten junior colleges to replace the pre-university classes in the senior high sections of The Chinese High School and other high schools in Singapore. Tan Keong Choon, a prominent businessman and the managing director of the board of The Chinese High School was appointed to oversee the project, estimated to cost S$2.2 million of which half of the total funds is to be funded by SCCCI.

After meetings and discussions, the Chinese community leaders declared to the government that due to financial constraints, they were able to raise sufficient funds for constructing only two of the originally intended ten junior colleges. Subsequently, the management board of The Chinese High School ceased the school's pre-university classes in preparation for the building of a new junior college. In 1974, Hwa Chong Junior College was inaugurated at the Bukit Timah Road campus of The Chinese High School, and was run by the same management board as the high school. The junior college's name was an abbreviation of the high school's Chinese name, to mark the relationship between the two schools.

Hwa Chong Junior College commenced lessons on 2 January 1974 in National Junior College, and the former Bukit Timah campus of the Singapore Management University. On 14 June 1974, the college commenced its operation at its permanent site at 661 Bukit Timah Road, located adjacent to the campus of The Chinese High School. With a cohort size of 1500 students and 88 staff, Hwa Chong Junior College was the largest junior college in Singapore in terms of enrollment. The initial facilities of the campus include a fully air-conditioned library, a multi-purpose hall, two lecture theatres of seating capacity of 300 and 500 respectively, ten laboratories and twenty-four tutorial rooms.

In the initial years, Hwa Chong Junior College offered pre-university courses in two language mediums, namely Chinese Language and English Language, before the restructuring of the education system in 1982. The uniform was designed by the pioneer batch of students, with the college crest, motto and anthem selected by the pioneering teachers. In 1981, Hwa Chong Junior College became the first junior college in Singapore to offer the Humanities Programme.

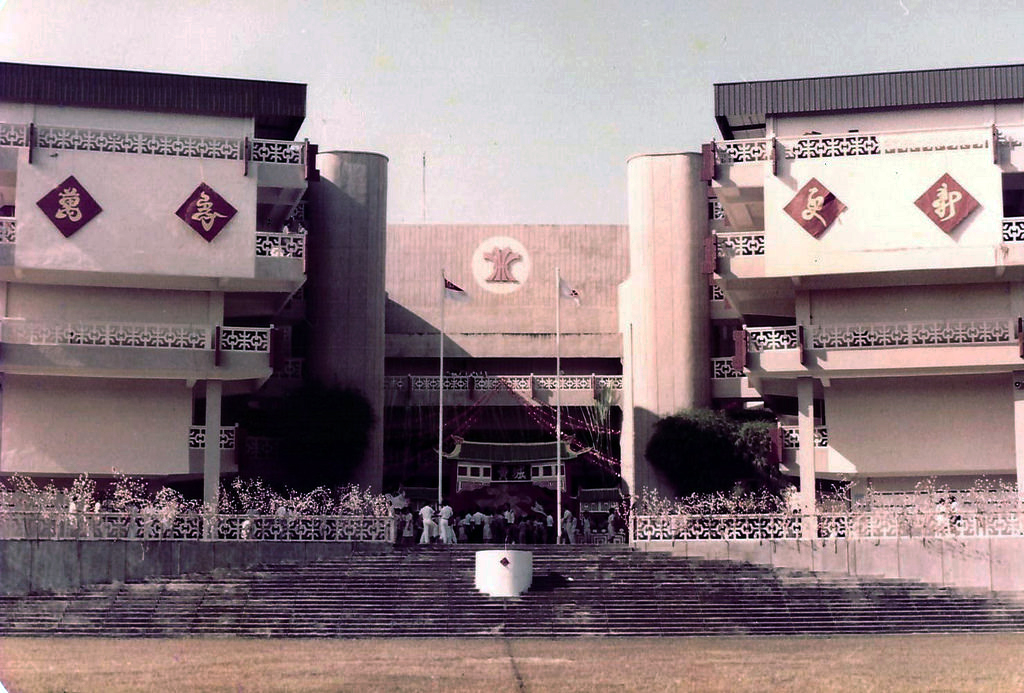
Facade of the old building of Hwa Chong Junior College, circa 1983.

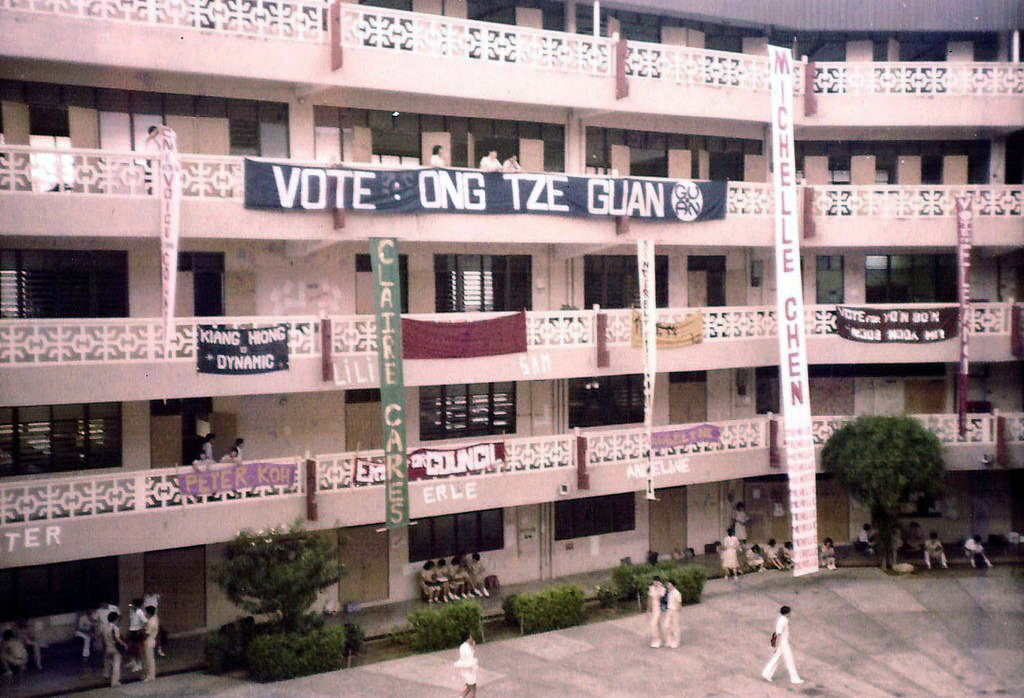
Tutorial Block of the old building of Hwa Chong Junior College, circa 1983.

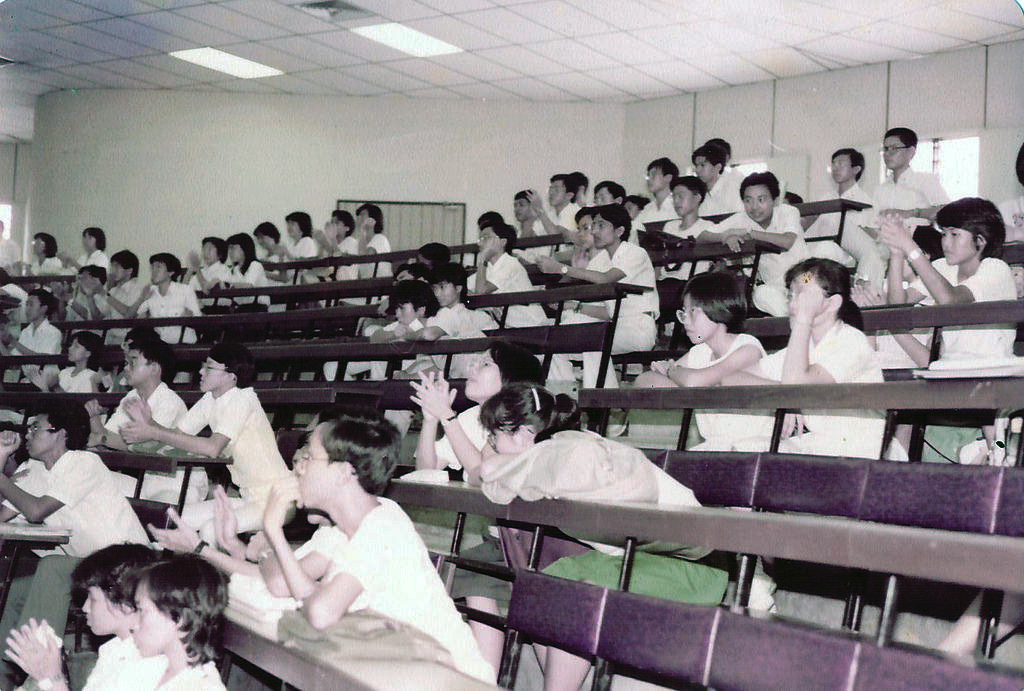
Lecture theatre of the old Hwa Chong Junior College building.

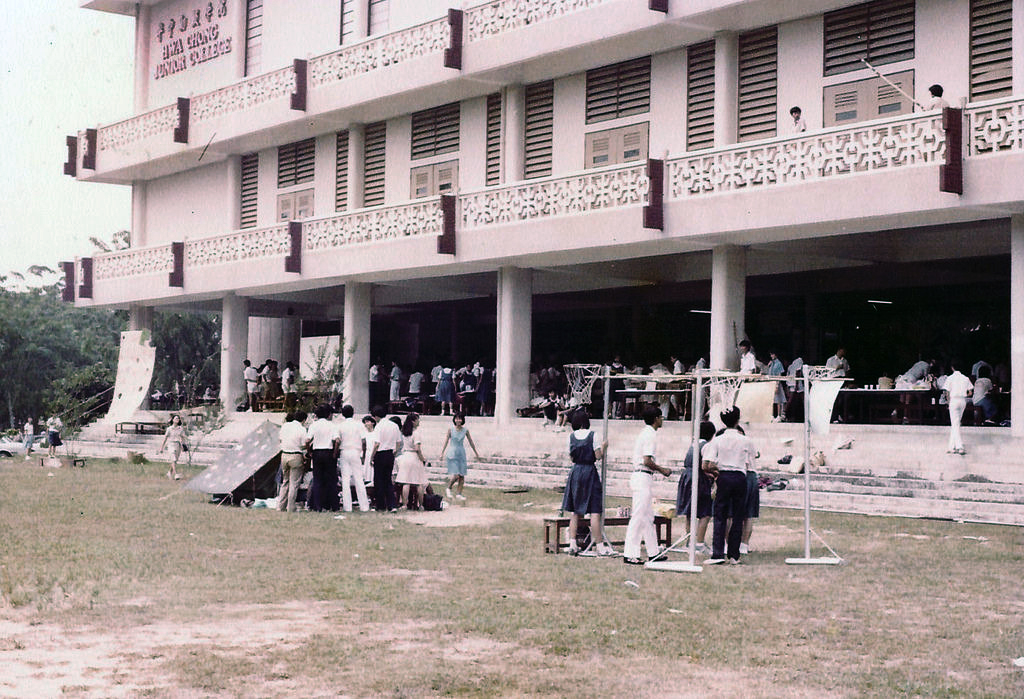
Field and Activity Block of the old Hwa Chong Junior College building.

=== Moving out and return to Bukit Timah ===
Following the Hotel New World collapse in 1986, the school management committee ordered a review on the building structure after walls in the college was reportedly ruptured. On 8 May 1987, Hwa Chong Junior College moved out of its premises at Bukit Timah Road due to structural problems with the building. The campus was redeveloped the following year, with the Ministry of Education covering 80 per cent of cost of standard facilities for the three-year long redevelopment project, the college itself raised the remaining $7 million. Between May and December 1987, lessons were held temporarily at Ngee Ann Polytechnic and Woodlands Street 81. The college shifted to Bukit Batok Street 34 (present-day site of Swiss Cottage Secondary School and St. Anthony's Primary School) later. HCJC moved back to its Bukit Timah campus in 1992. The new building had considerable changes to the architecture style, while the octagonal layout remained in the new building. The rebuilt campus also features the largest and most comprehensive library among all junior colleges in Singapore.

Hwa Chong Junior College was one of the first junior colleges to offer the Chinese Language Elective Programme (C-LEP) along with Temasek Junior College, when the course was introduced in 1990.

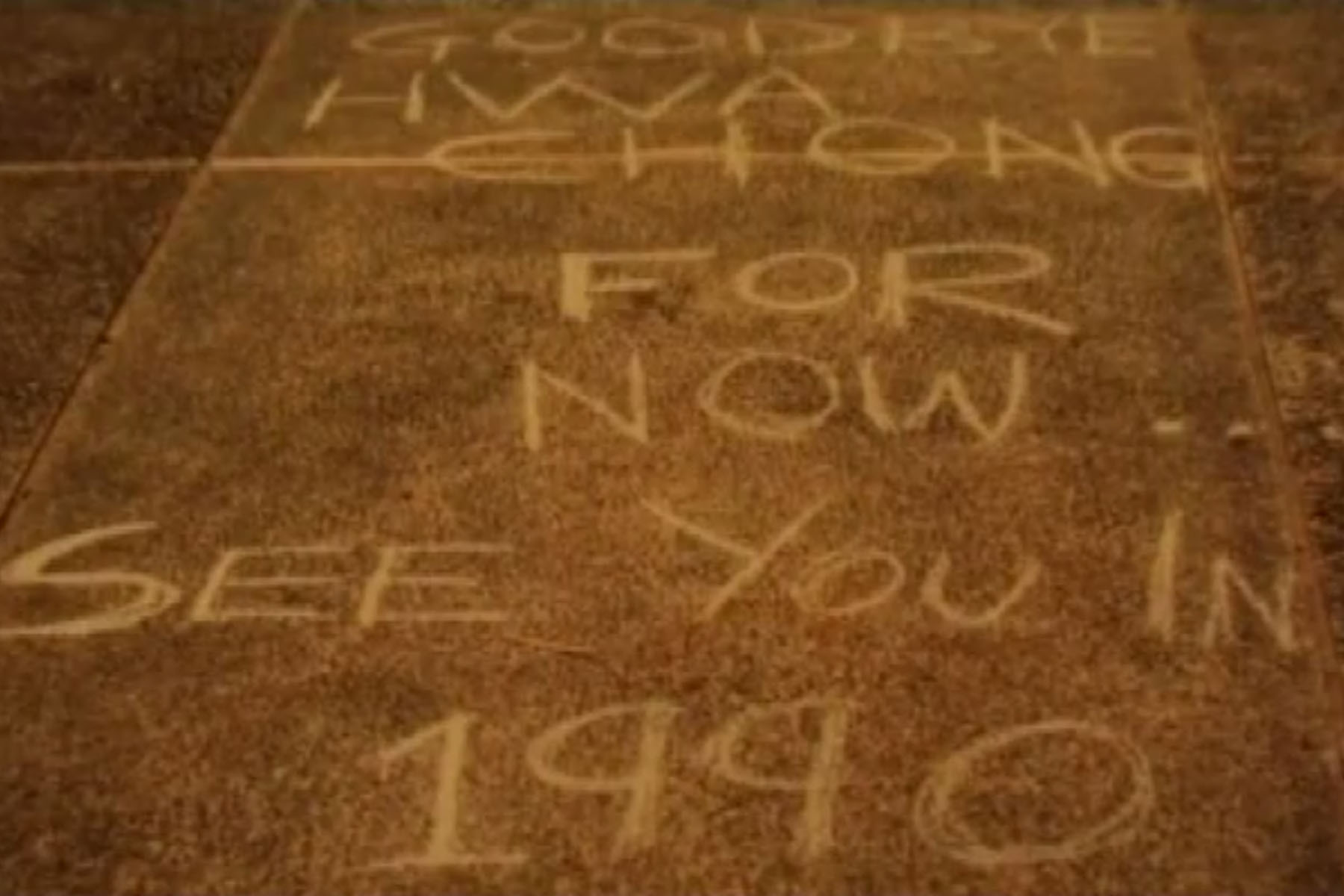
Memories written by students at the central plaza before the building was torn down and rebuilt, in 1986

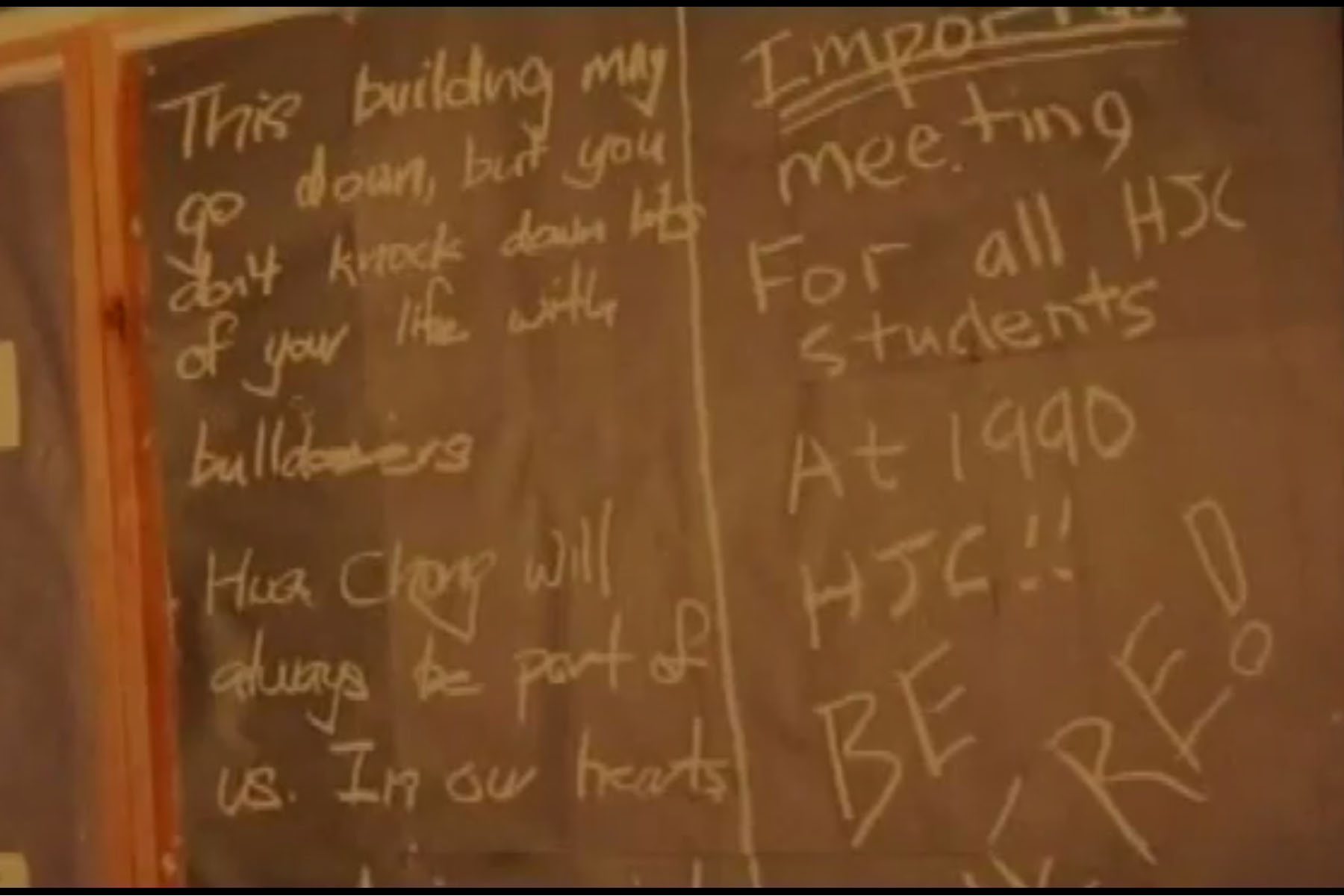
Memories written by students on the Hwa Chong Junior College school building before it was torn down and rebuilt, in 1986

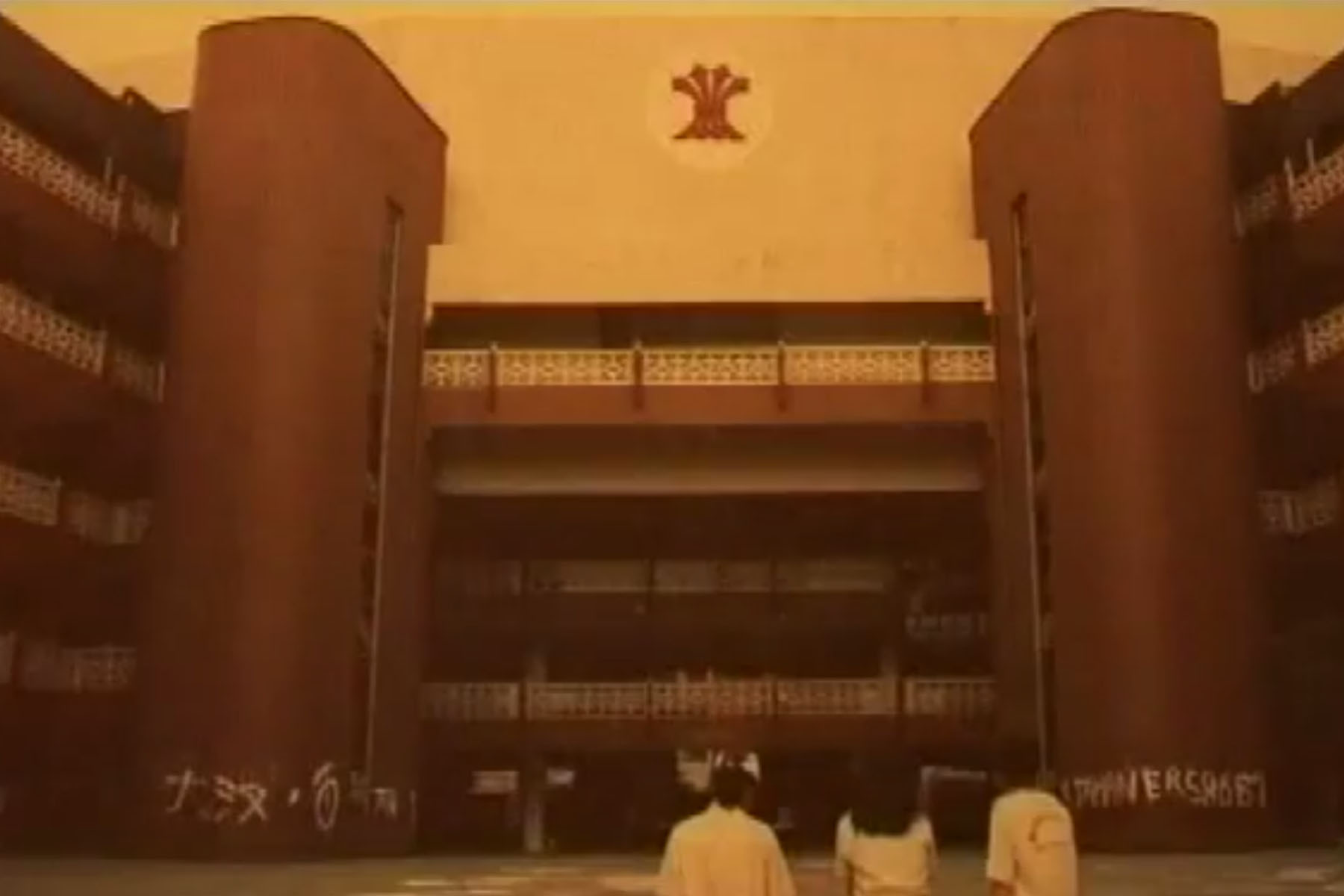
The college building of Hwa Chong Junior College with memories written by students in 1986, before the building was torn down.

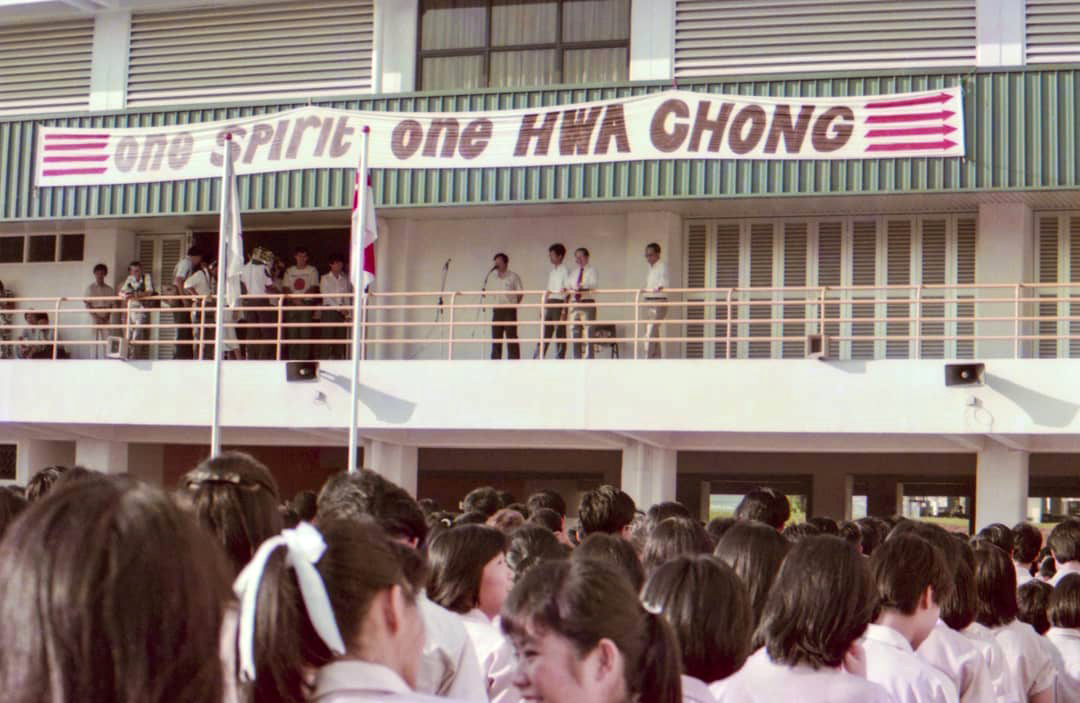
The first day of the former Hwa Chong Junior College at the temporary campus in Woodlands, in 1987.

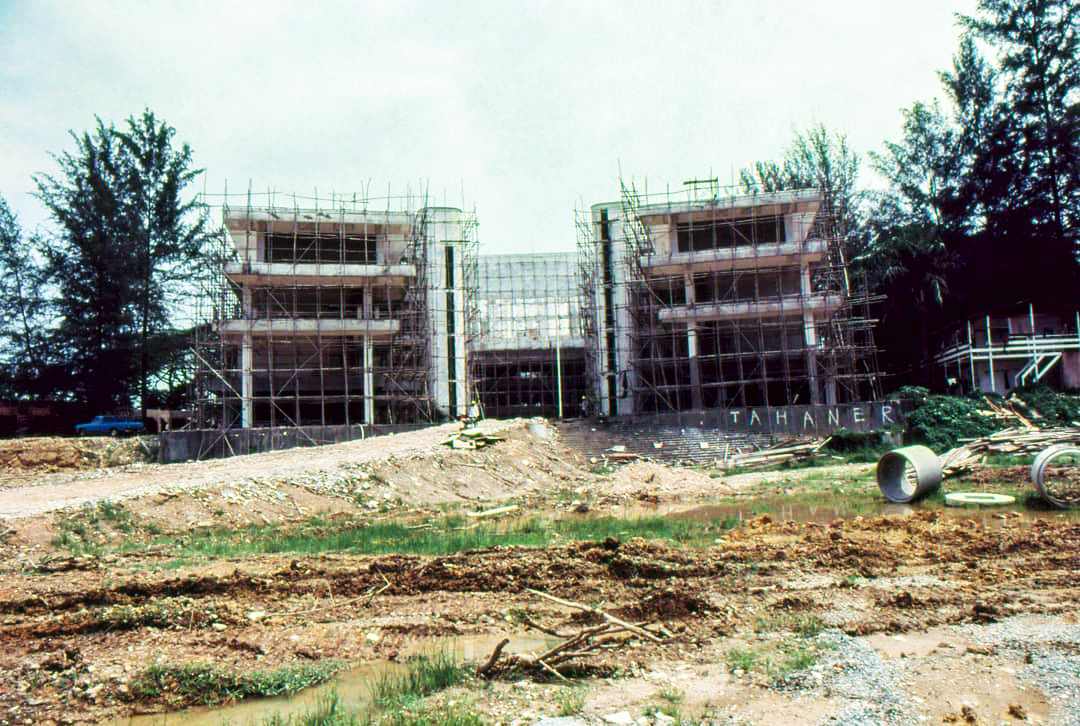
The campus of Hwa Chong Junior College during the reconstruction in 1990.

=== Merger with Chinese High School ===
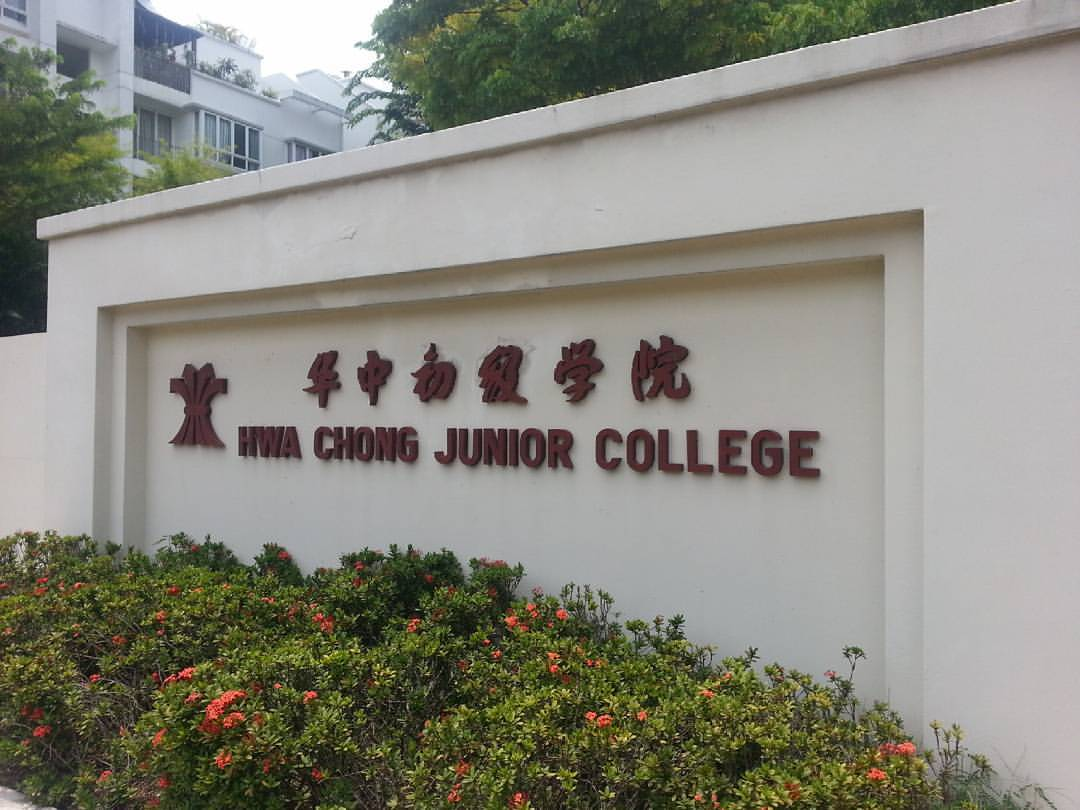
Entrance cornerstone of the former Hwa Chong Junior College. It is one of the few remaining features that were preserved after the reintegration into Hwa Chong Institution in 2005.

In January 2004, Hwa Chong Junior College became the first junior college in Singapore to gain independent status. On 1 January 2005, the college officially merged with The Chinese High School to form the current Hwa Chong Institution, to facilitate the running of the school's Integrated Programme.

== Principal ==
Principals who had served the former Hwa Chong Junior College from 1974 to 2004 are as follows.

Principal	Years served
Lim Nai Tian (林乃田)	1974–1975
Wu Tsung Kan (吴从干)	1975–1979
Lim Kim Woon (林钦蕴)	1979–1980
Bernard Fong (冯福泽)	1980–1988
Chan Tung Fong (陈腾芳)	1989–1993
Leong Fan Chin (梁环清)	1993–1998
Ang Wee Hiong (洪伟雄)	1999–2004

== Culture & Identity ==
The school offers Malay and Tamil language subjects, as well as foreign languages such as German and French. Multi-cultural based co-curricular activities such as English drama, contemporary dance, as well as those representative of other cultures, such as Indian dance, are also featured among the college's array of activities.

=== Crest ===
The college crest used before merger with The Chinese High School was represented by four upward arrows bounded by a horizontal bar. These arrows represents the initial streams in the college, namely Arts, Science, Technical and Commerce, as well as the educational aims of social, moral, intellectual and physical growth, together with continued advancement as indicated by the soaring arrows. The horizontal bar that holds the arrows together signifies unity and the withholding of excellence.

=== Uniform ===
The uniform of the former Hwa Chong Junior College was designed by a Malay female student (one of the pioneer batch of students who graduated from HCJC in 1975), and is a distinct feature of HCJC. The uniform for male students comprise a beige shirt featuring two shirt pockets, an identity of the uniform, complemented with long beige trousers. The uniform for female students comprise a beige blouse and a beige skirt. The same uniform was retained as the uniform for the college section of Hwa Chong Institution.

== Campus ==
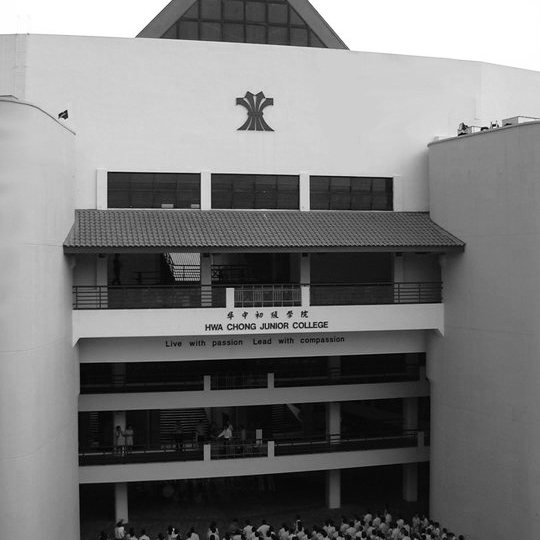
Hwa Chong Junior College Central Plaza in 2004.

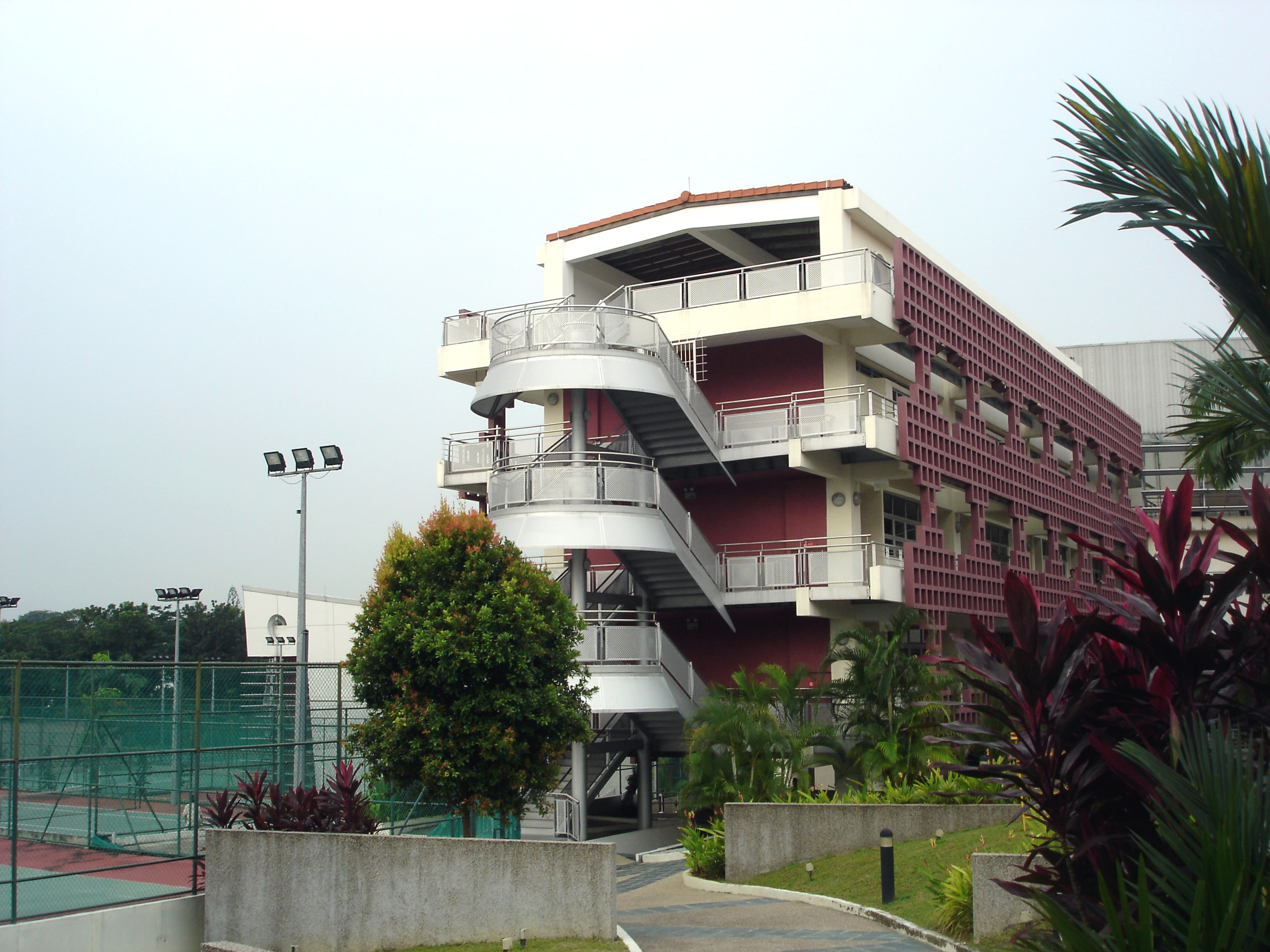
The Cheng Yi Building of HCJC, presently part of the college building of HCI.

The campus of Hwa Chong Junior College is the current college compound for the integrated Hwa Chong Institution, previously separated and fenced before 2006. The iconic octagonal shaped central building of Hwa Chong Junior College is based on the basis of a divine Taoist sign. It houses facilities such as the college library, co-curricular activity (CCA) rooms, and provide ample space for student-led activities. The adjacent tutorial block houses three lecture theatres and an auditorium, as well special rooms for the humanities and language elective programmes.

Due to its iconic yellow-coloured walls and oriental architecture, Hwa Chong Junior College was also known affectionately as "黄城" (Chinese: Literal meaning "Yellow Town"), which is deeply reflected in the literary works and composes by its students since the 1970s.

== Achievements ==
Hwa Chong Junior College was consistently ranked as one of the top junior colleges in Singapore based on the official college rankings by the Ministry of Education since the 1990s. The college was consistently ranked as the top college for Arts and Commerce. The college had also been ranked as the top junior college in Singapore in terms of academic performance for its Science stream students and in overall performance for a number of times.

The college had an excellent track record in academia, sports, music, culture and the arts. Many of its graduates went on to become leaders in research, industry and government. Between 1980 and 2005, Hwa Chong had been recognized as one of the top junior colleges in Singapore, alongside others such as Raffles Junior College. Hwa Chong was also the first junior college to introduce the Humanities Scholarship Programme for students.

As at the time of merger with The Chinese High School in 2005, Hwa Chong Junior College had produced the second highest number of President's Scholars (second only to Raffles Junior College). In addition, Hwa Chong graduates take an impressive share of government and private organization undergraduate scholarships annually. More than 15% of each graduating cohort move on to study in renowned universities worldwide, such as Harvard University and Cambridge University. Hwa Chong Junior College also had the distinction of being the top junior college for two elective programmes, namely the Humanities Programme and the Chinese Language Elective Programme.

== See also ==
- Hwa Chong Institution
- The Chinese High School (Singapore)
- List of Hwa Chong Institution people
