= MICappella =

Singaporean a cappella group

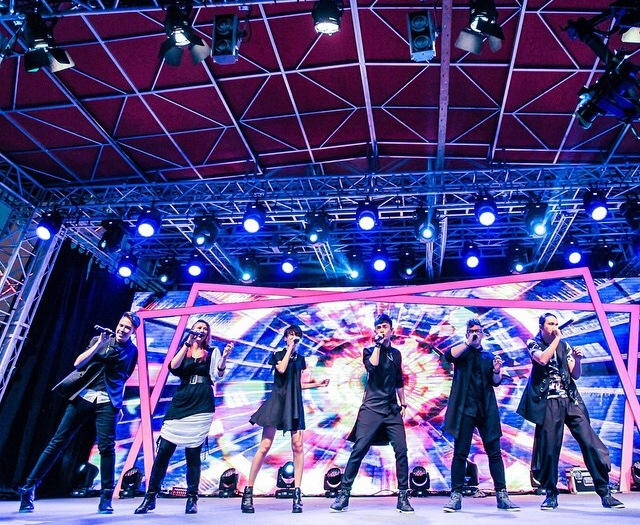
- MICappella performing at Shanghai's 2014 Daning music festival

Background information
- Origin: Singapore
- Genre: A cappella
- Years active: 2009–present
- Labels: S2S Pte. Ltd. (2009–2015); Universal Music Singapore; Cross Ratio Entertainment (2016–present)
- Members: Tay Kexin; Calin Wong; Goh Juni; Peter Huang; Eugene Yip; Lai Jee Yon
- Past members: Phay Su Hui; Alex Tan; Tan Soon Heng; Celeste Syn; Timothy Huang; Ng Wei Jin; Lee Ein Ein; Judah Teng; Goh Mingwei
- Website: MICappella.com

MICappella is a Singaporean a cappella group. They made their debut after competing in the Chinese edition of The Sing-Off, where they won second place.

The band appeared at National Day Parade 2018 and 2022 Celebrations and Singapore Day 2019 in Shanghai. That same year, they were also invited to perform their rendition of the National Anthem during the Singapore Grand Prix Flag-off ceremony.

MICappella has released three albums till date. Their latest 2019 EP “LOVE, MICappella” was awarded Outstanding Asian Album and Best Original Song by a Professional Group. The band has performed in Europe, Australia, China, USA, Russia, Malaysia, and many more.

== History ==
=== Early years (2009–2010) ===
Peter Huang was the leader of the a cappella group Skritch during his schooling days and had toured United States, Canada, and Taiwan as a solo artist. In 2009, wanting to continue doing a cappella, he came up with the idea of forming an a cappella group with a distinctive focus on rock and pop music, performing in both Mandarin Chinese and English. This idea stood in contrast to the prevailing jazz-centric a cappella groups in Singapore. Huang met Calin Wong when the former came to the latter's company for a job interview, and proposed his idea to her. Their initial interactions, facilitated by chance encounters and mutual acquaintances, led to the establishment of MICappella in April 2009. The group's name, a blend of "microphone" and "a cappella," also carries linguistic nuances, interpreted by its members as a playful reference to the Hokkien phrase 莫哭爸啦; mài khàu-pē--la, meaning "don't be noisy." This clever wordplay reflects the group's energetic and dynamic nature. In its nascent stage, MICappella was rounded up by Tan Soon Heng (bass), Eugene Yip (baritone), Alex Tan (tenor), and Phay Su Hui (soprano), with only half of them being full-time musicians.

The group marked their debut public performance at the finals of the DrumZout 2009 percussion competition, held on June 20, 2009, at the VivoCity Amphitheatre. Following this, they showcased their talents at the National A Cappella Championships in July of the same year. During the preliminary round, they secured the top score and Gold Award, later earning the position of runners-up in the finals, along with the prestigious Best Soloist prize. This period also marked a significant change in their lineup, with Celeste Syn replacing Phay Su Hui as the soprano vocalist. In October, they furthered their international presence by participating in the Taiwan International Contemporary A Cappella Festival, where Peter Huang was honored with the Best Vocal Percussionist Award.

MICappella received an exclusive invitation to showcase their talents at the 2010 Hong Kong International A Cappella Extravaganza, spanning from March 27 to April 22, where they stood out as the sole representative from Southeast Asia. During this prestigious event, they shared the stage with renowned singer-songwriter Khalil Fong. On May 14, the group independently launched their debut EP, Feng Kuang, featuring four tracks that primarily comprised cover versions of popular Chinese and English songs. Simultaneously, they participated in Esplanade's Late Night Series, marking Tan Soon Heng's farewell performance with the group. Vocaluptuous bass vocalist Timothy Huang temporarily joined MICappella for this event as a special guest until they secured Ng Wei Jin, who had previously sang with Peter Huang in Skritch, as his permanent replacement. With this lineup, they performed a medley at the opening ceremony of the 2010 Summer Youth Olympics held in Singapore and the grand finals of the Chinese Challenge 2010, where they did a rap together with hosts Guo Liang and Danny Yeo.

On November 27, 2010, MICappella delivered a memorable performance as part of the 25th-anniversary celebrations for the Association of Women for Action and Research (AWARE). Notably, this marked their first performance without Alex Tan and Celeste Syn, who had respectively held positions as the tenor and soprano vocalists. Their roles were assumed by Juni Goh and Lee Ein Ein. Following this event, the group's manager and Peter Huang's wife, Diana Tan, officially confirmed the departure of Tan and Syn from MICappella via their official Facebook page.

=== Rise to fame and Here We Go (2011–2013) ===
In 2011, the group represented Singapore during the fifth season of Taiwanese singing competition Super Idol, where their exceptional performance led them to clinch victory in the challenge, garnering the highest scores among all competitors. In April of the same year, they were honored to serve as the opening act for the Singapore e-Awards 2011, organized by the Singapore Press Holdings. Continuing their momentum, they released their self-titled second EP in July and held two shows titled "MICappella Featuring:" on July 15 at the Esplanade Recital Studio to promote their work. Subsequently, they showcased their talent on an international stage in Graz, Austria, where they represented Singapore in Europe's largest international a cappella competition, vokal.total.2011, earning a prestigious Bronze Diploma for their outstanding performance.

In July 2012, MICappella embarked on a journey to Shenzhen, Guangdong, China, where they took part in the inaugural season of The Sing-Off China, a regional spin-off of the renowned American reality television competition The Sing-Off. Immersed in the competition for close to three months, the band showcased their talent and dedication, culminating in their achievement as the competition's first runner-up in September. This pivotal moment marked the transition of the band into a full-time professional a cappella group, signifying their commitment to their craft and passion for music.

In January 2013, MICappella solidified their professional journey by signing a contract with record label S2S Pte. Ltd. They appeared during the finals of the fourth season of singing competition Campus SuperStar, in which they provided a cappella accompaniment for the top four contestants during the first round, with YK Teng stepping in temporarily for Ng Wei Jin as the bass vocalist due to Ng's absence. Shortly after, the band received an invitation to showcase their talent at the prestigious 2013 Spring Vocal Festival in Taiwan on April 7, where once again, Teng filled in for Ng.

On April 16, 2013, MICappella released their debut album Here We Go, featuring two original songs, the title track and "Whatever", with the rest being cover songs which they have frequently performed and were featured in their earlier two EPs. On May 31, 2013, the group held a sold-out concert titled "Late Nite @ Esplanade: MICappella – Here We Go" at Esplanade Recital Studio. Following this event, Ng made the decision to depart from the group, leading to Teng's promotion to a full-time member.

In July 2013, MICappella is slated to act in The Hospital, a Chinese-language slasher genre film produced by Lion City Film Studio, alongside Michael Chua, in what would be their first acting roles. However, not much has progressed since the pre-production stage.

In 2013, MICappella showcased their talent at various international festivals, including the Strawberry Festival in Beijing and Shanghai, China, the Borneo Cultural Festival in Sibu, Sarawak, Malaysia, the AMC Live Rock On Music Festival in Chengdu, China, the 4th Fringe Festival in Shenzhen, China, and the SoJam A Cappella Festival 2013 in Raleigh, North Carolina, United States, in which they were the first group in Asia to participate. Their excellence was recognized with the title of Favorite Asian A Cappella Group at the 2013 A Cappella Community Awards (ACAs) and the "Local Media Nominated Singer" award at the Singapore Hit Awards 2013.

=== Lineup changes and MICappella Reloaded (2014–2017) ===
On May 23, 2014, MICappella announced that they would be holding auditions in the month of June in search of a bass vocalist, in light of YK Teng's impending departure in August. With Teng (later known as Judah Teng) transitioning to a career in web development while continuing to contribute his musical talents as a bassist for Christian worship community Relentless Grace, they reunited with former bass Ng Wei Jin on August 1 during a performance at the launch of the now-shelved mixed use project Dagon City 1 in Yangon, Myanmar. Eventually, photographer-singer Goh Mingwei was selected as their new bass vocalist. On October 11, MICappella graced the stage as the guest performer at the Singapore leg of Khalil Fong's "Soulboy Lights Up" concert tour. The group embarked on a tour of China, commencing with their debut performance at the Daning Music Festival in Shanghai on October 19. Notably, MICappella was recommended by Singapore Deputy Prime Minister Teo Chee Hean to perform at the Suzhou Culture and Arts Centre in celebration of the 20th anniversary of the China-Singapore Suzhou Industrial Park on October 26, 2014. This recommendation propelled the band into an active touring schedule throughout the region.

In January 2015, Lee Ein Ein departed to pursue music studies in Los Angeles, and Tay Kexin, the younger sister of singer-songwriter Tay Kewei, joined the group as her replacement. Tay debuted with the group at ITE College East's Orientation Show on January 13. Additionally, the band announced its forthcoming European tour, with scheduled stops in the United Kingdom, Germany, and the Netherlands, including one at the London A Cappella Festival 2015 on January 30, in which they were the first Singaporean group to perform.

In December 2015, MICappella unveiled a mashup video featuring Hu Xia's "Those Bygone Years" from You Are the Apple of My Eye and Hebe Tien's "A Little Happiness" from Our Times. The video garnered one million views on Facebook within five days of its release. Additionally, the group announced plans for new material slated for release in 2016.

On February 29, 2016, MICappella released "One Of These Days" as the lead single from their highly anticipated second album. Titled MICappella Reloaded, the album was announced for release on May 26, showcasing a collection of original tracks alongside a cover of JJ Lin's "If Only." Following this milestone, in June 2016, MICappella secured a record deal with Universal Music Singapore. To promote MICappella Reloaded, the group embarked on a concert tour from October 26 to November 3, making stops in Taipei, Shenzhen, and Beijing. Concurrently, the album earned the prestigious title of Best Asian A Cappella Album at the 2017 Contemporary A Cappella Recording Awards (CARAs) in the United States.

From March 12 to 16, 2017, MICappella undertook a tour across Hamburg, Berlin, and Munich in Germany. Their journey culminated in representing Singapore at the Chinese-Bavaria Spring Festival 2017 held in Munich on March 16. In May of the same year, they participated in the inaugural Moscow Spring A Cappella Festival, where they stood as the sole Asian representative in the medium group category, competing among groups with six to ten members. Throughout the week-long festival, featuring performances at various iconic locations in Moscow, MICappella emerged victorious, claiming the championship title over more than 160 finalists.

On July 17, MICappella released a video titled "Evolution Of NDP Songs," featuring a four-minute medley of Singapore's National Day Parade songs. The video gained viral traction on social media platforms, surpassing 1 million views by August 9 and garnering hundreds of thousands of shares on Facebook. Notably, Prime Minister Lee Hsien Loong shared the video on August 2, praising their "ambitious" rendition of the patriotic tunes.

In August 2017, MICappella was invited by the Korea Music Content Association to perform at the 2017 Asia Song Festival in Busan, South Korea on September 24, marking their debut performance in the country. Following this, they were among several Singaporean acts who performed at Singapore Day 2017 in Melbourne, Australia, on September 8. On November 2, they held a concert titled "You and I" at the Capitol Theatre, marking their first major solo show in four years.

=== LOVE, MICappella (2018–2021) ===
In April 2018, the group traveled to Boston, Massachusetts, United States, where they showcased their talent at the Boston Sings A Cappella Festival (BOSS) 2018 on April 8. They further engaged with music enthusiasts by hosting a music showcase at the Berklee College of Music on April 13. Additionally, they had the honor of performing during a dinner reception for overseas Singaporeans, hosted by Ashok Kumar Mirpuri, Singapore's Ambassador to the United States of America. On April 20, they released their original single, "Home at Last", co-written by group members Tay Kexin, Peter Huang, and Goh Mingwei, accompanied by a captivating music video starring Constance Lau. On June 9, they served as guest performers during the Singapore leg of David Tao's concert tour "Up-close with David Tao", where they joined him to perform an a cappella rendition of "Our Story".

On July 18, MICappella unveiled "Evolution of NDP Songs V2.0," an enhanced rendition of their 2017 viral video "Evolution of NDP Songs." This updated version features a broader selection of songs, covering all four of Singapore's official languages, and incorporates more elaborate visuals, including primary school children portraying younger versions of the group members. As of July 24, the video has amassed over 20,000 views on YouTube. Additionally, they were invited to perform their medley at the National Day Parade 2018, marking their inaugural appearance at this prestigious event.

MICappella made their debut in Japan by performing at Kanazawa A Cappella Town 2018 on August 25 and 26. This marked their first-ever performance in the country. Following this, they returned to Moscow to participate in the Singapore Festival 2018 on September 14 and 15. The event, organized by the Singapore Tourism Board, commemorated the fiftieth anniversary of bilateral ties between Singapore and Russia.

Throughout 2019, MICappella released a series of original singles, starting with "You Are the One," co-written by Peter Huang and Jim Lim for Valentine's Day. This was followed by "I Want Your Love" on April 18, with music co-composed by Huang, Tat Tong, and Nat Ho, featuring lyrics by Kelly Loh. The song includes an interpolation of Grace Chang's 1957 track of the same name and its music video features Ferlyn Wong and Ayden Sng. Meanwhile, the group performed at Singapore Day 2019 at Century Park in Shanghai on April 13. "Through Your Eyes," penned by Calin Wong, was released on May 3 in honor of Mother's Day.

On September 1, MICappella released "Long Live Friendship" as a single, revealing that it would be part of an upcoming EP featuring original songs. Later, on September 22, the group was honored with an invitation to perform their rendition of "Majulah Singapura" during the flag-off ceremony for the Singapore Grand Prix. Their EP, titled LOVE, MICappella, was officially launched on November 29, with "Flame of Life" serving as the lead single.

MICappella had planned a significant concert to support their EP LOVE, MICappella in 2020, but due to COVID-19 restrictions, all large-scale in-person events were either canceled or postponed. In response, the group initiated a series of livestreams on Facebook and Instagram every Tuesday and Thursday from 9 to 9:30 pm, starting March 31. Each member took turns hosting, engaging with fans through Q&A sessions and song requests. On May 28, MICappella participated in Music for a Cause 2020, a livestreamed event organized by Love Action Project and supported by the National Youth Council Singapore to raise funds for musicians, hawkers, and frontline workers. They also took part in Hear65 Sing Along SG on June 6, a digital karaoke concert series hosted by Munah Bagharib. On July 30, in collaboration with the National University Health System, they released a video covering Rachel Platten's "Fight Song" to honor Nurses' Day. Throughout September 22, October 26, and November 24, MICappella continued their livestream sessions, offering insights into their music and behind-the-scenes work, hosting games, and conducting giveaways.

On February 27, 2021, MICappella participated in the Los Angeles A Cappella Festival 2021, held virtually. They announced their long-awaited "LOVE, MICappella" concert on May 15 and 16 at the Sands Theatre, Marina Bay Sands, on April 11. However, due to the pandemic, it was initially rescheduled to July 30 and 31, then to October 1 and 2. Meanwhile, they released the original single "I'm OK", penned by Juni Goh with Mark Shi and Dayvid Foo, on August 20, to raise awareness of mental health issues. During their "LOVE, MICappella" concert, they unveiled another original single, "Remember", written by Eugene Yip alongside Edric Hwang and Daphne Khoo, slated for release on October 8. They also announced the upcoming release of their EP Love, Life.

=== Love, Life (2022–present) ===
On January 6, 2022, MICappella released "Party Time" as their first single of the year. Composed by group member Tay Kexin, with Belinda Ang contributing to its lyrics, it also exists in an alternate version credited to Tay as a solo artist titled "Special Edition," featuring accompaniment by a band. The subsequent original single, "Happy Birthday," composed by Peter Huang alongside Tat Tong and written by Huang and Gao Mei Gui, was scheduled for release on April 1, coinciding with the group's thirteenth anniversary since formation. On April 14, they hosted the "MICappella Sing-On" concert at Infinite Studios to celebrate their tenth anniversary since their appearance on The Sing-Off China. During the concert, they performed numbers from the competition, recent covers, and original songs. Additionally, former members Lee Ein Ein and Ng Wei Jin reunited with the group to perform two songs together.

On June 3, the group released their original single "Tell Me Why," co-written by Calin Wong and former member Celeste Syn, who has since found success as a singer-songwriter. The song is accompanied by an animated music video created by Andimoo Studios. On July 12, they announced their headline performance at the 2022 National Day Parade, where they will perform the track "We Are a Symphony," written by singer-songwriter YAØ, accompanied by dancers from the People's Association during the third act of the parade's show segment. On November 4, they released another original single, "Silent Strength". co-written by Goh Mingwei alongside Ariane Goh and Kelly Loh.

On April 7, 2023, MICappella launched their EP Love, Life, comprising six previously released singles along with the new track "Craze", co-written by all six members, which served as a promotional lead. Subsequently, they embarked on an eleven-day tour of Taiwan from April 14 to April 24. The group debuted the lyric video for "Craze" on June 13, featuring AI-generated visuals, a pioneering move for them. On August 5, they collaborated with Vocaluptuous for the first time during the fifth edition of the Gardens by the Bay and Mediacorp National Day Concert, where they performed a medley of popular songs from various decades.

== Members ==
=== Current members ===
- Peter Huang – vocal percussion, tenor vocals, leader (2009–present)
- Calin Wong – alto vocals (2009–present)
- Eugene Yip – baritone vocals, vocal percussion (2009–present)
- Juni Goh – tenor vocals (2010–present)
- Tay Kexin – soprano vocals (2015–present)
- Lai Jee Yon – bass vocals (2026–present; fill-in 2025–2026)

=== Former members ===
- Phay Su Hui – soprano vocals (2009)
- Alex Tan – tenor vocals (2009–2010)
- Tan Soon Heng – bass vocals (2009–2010)
- Celeste Syn – soprano vocals (2009–2010)
- Timothy Huang – bass vocals (2010)
- Ng Wei Jin – bass vocals (2010–2013; one-off guest appearance 2022)
- Lee Ein Ein – soprano vocals (2010–2015; one-off guest appearance 2022)
- YK (Judah) Teng – bass vocals (2013–2014; fill-in 2013)
- Goh Mingwei – bass vocals (2014–2025)

== Discography ==
=== Albums ===
Year	Title	Ref
2013	Here We Go	
2016	MICappella Reloaded	

=== EPs ===
Year	Title
2010	疯狂 Feng Kuang
2011	MICappella
2019	LOVE, MICappella
2023	Love, Life

=== Singles ===
Year	Title	Album
2016	One Of These Days	MICappella Reloaded
2016	爱 Love	MICappella Reloaded
2018	终于能回家 Home at Last	Non-album single
2019	You Are The One	LOVE, MICappella
2019	我要你的爱 I Want Your Love	LOVE, MICappella
2019	Through Your Eyes	LOVE, MICappella
2019	友谊万岁 Long Live Friendship	LOVE, MICappella
2021	還好 I'm OK	Love, Life
2021	Remember	Love, Life
2022	我的 Party Time Party Time	Love, Life
2022	Happy Birthday	Love, Life
2022	坦白說 Tell Me Why	Love, Life
2022	We Are a Symphony	Non-album single
2022	悄悄地 Silent Strength	Love, Life

== Awards and nominations ==
Year	Event	Award	Result	Ref
2013	A Cappella Community Awards	"Favourite Asian A cappella Group"	Won	
2013	Singapore Hit Awards	"Best Local Artiste" – Media Choice	Won	
2013	Singapore Hit Awards	"Outstanding Regional Artiste"	Nominated	
2013	Singapore Hit Awards	"Most Popular Newcomer Award"	Nominated	
2013	Singapore Hit Awards	"Most Popular Group Award"	Nominated	
2013	Singapore Hit Awards	"Best Group Award"	Nominated	
2017	Contemporary A Cappella Recording Awards	"Best Pop/Rock Album"	Nominated	
2017	Contemporary A Cappella Recording Awards	"Best Asian Album"	Won	
2017	Contemporary A Cappella Recording Awards	"Best Original Song By a Professional Group"	Nominated	
2017	Moscow Spring A Cappella Festival	Medium Category	Won	
2020	Contemporary A Cappella Recording Awards	"Outstanding Asian Album"	Won	
2020	Contemporary A Cappella Recording Awards	"Best Original Song by a Professional Group" - Through Your Eyes	Won	
2020	Contemporary A Cappella Recording Awards	"Best Rock/Pop Album"	Nominated	
2020	Contemporary A Cappella Recording Awards	"Best Pop Song" - Through Your Eyes	Nominated	
2020	Contemporary A Cappella Recording Awards	"Best Professional Arrangement for a Non-Scholastic Group"	Nominated	

== Music charts ==
Year	Title	Chart	Chart Position
2nd quarter 2013	MICappella	YES 93.3 醉心龙虎榜 Most Popular Band	No.5
April – June 2013	Album Here We Go	HMV Singapore Asian Chart	Charted for 2 months, highest position No.3
April – June 2013	Song "Here We Go"	YES 93.3 醉心龙虎榜	Charted for 4 weeks, highest position No.10
June 2013	Album Here We Go	CD-Rama Regional Top Charts	No.8
