= Anderson Junior College =

Coordinates: 1°22′42.6″N 103°50′44.7″E

Location
- 4500 Ang Mo Kio Avenue 6, Singapore 569843

Information
- Type: Public; Government
- Motto: Non Mihi Solum (Not for Myself Alone)
- Established: 1984; 42 years ago
- Closed: 2019; 7 years ago
- School code: 0705
- Colours: Yellow; Blue
- Website: www.ajc.moe.edu.sg

Anderson Junior College (AJC) was a junior college established in 1984 and located in Yio Chu Kang, Singapore, offering two-year pre-university courses leading to the Singapore-Cambridge GCE Advanced Level examinations.

In 2019, it was merged with Serangoon Junior College (SRJC) and renamed as Anderson Serangoon Junior College (ASRJC). The new junior college remained at AJC's site.

== History ==
Anderson Junior College was the 11th junior college to be established in Singapore and received its first batch of students in 1984. It celebrates its anniversary on the fifth of April each year. The Anderson Junior College Hostel was planned and construction commenced in 2009. The hostel was opened in 2012.

On 20 April 2017, it was announced that AJC would merge with the merged school located at the current site of AJC. The merged school was named as Anderson Serangoon Junior College, which is a combination of the two schools' names, from 2019.

== Principal ==
Name of Principal	Years served
Lee Fong Seng	1984–1988
Rebecca Mok	1988–1992
Tan Teng Wah	1992–2001
Tan Tiek Kwee	2001-2006
Susan Leong	2006–2011
Lee Seng Hai	2011-2015
Tay Lai Ling	2016–2018

== Identity and culture ==
=== Crest ===
The college crest is formed from the initials of the college. The letter A, in the form of a yellow flame, symbolises the vitality and youthful aspirations of the students. The dark blue letters, J and C, supporting the flame, symbolise college support for the individual in his efforts to realise his ambition. The four circles at the base depict racial harmony, highlighting the college motto.

The crest was designed by Mr. Heng Eng Hwa in 1984.

=== Motto ===
The college motto was Non Mihi Solum, which is Latin for Not for Myself Alone.

=== House system ===
For competitive intra-school events, the school population was divided into five houses:

- Jaguar (Red)
- Panther (Yellow)
- Puma (Green)
- Cheetah (Grey)
- Cougar (Blue)

The House Committee is in charge of each house, with each house having at The House Captain and the Vice-Captain. The house committee is made up of student councillors.

== Campus ==
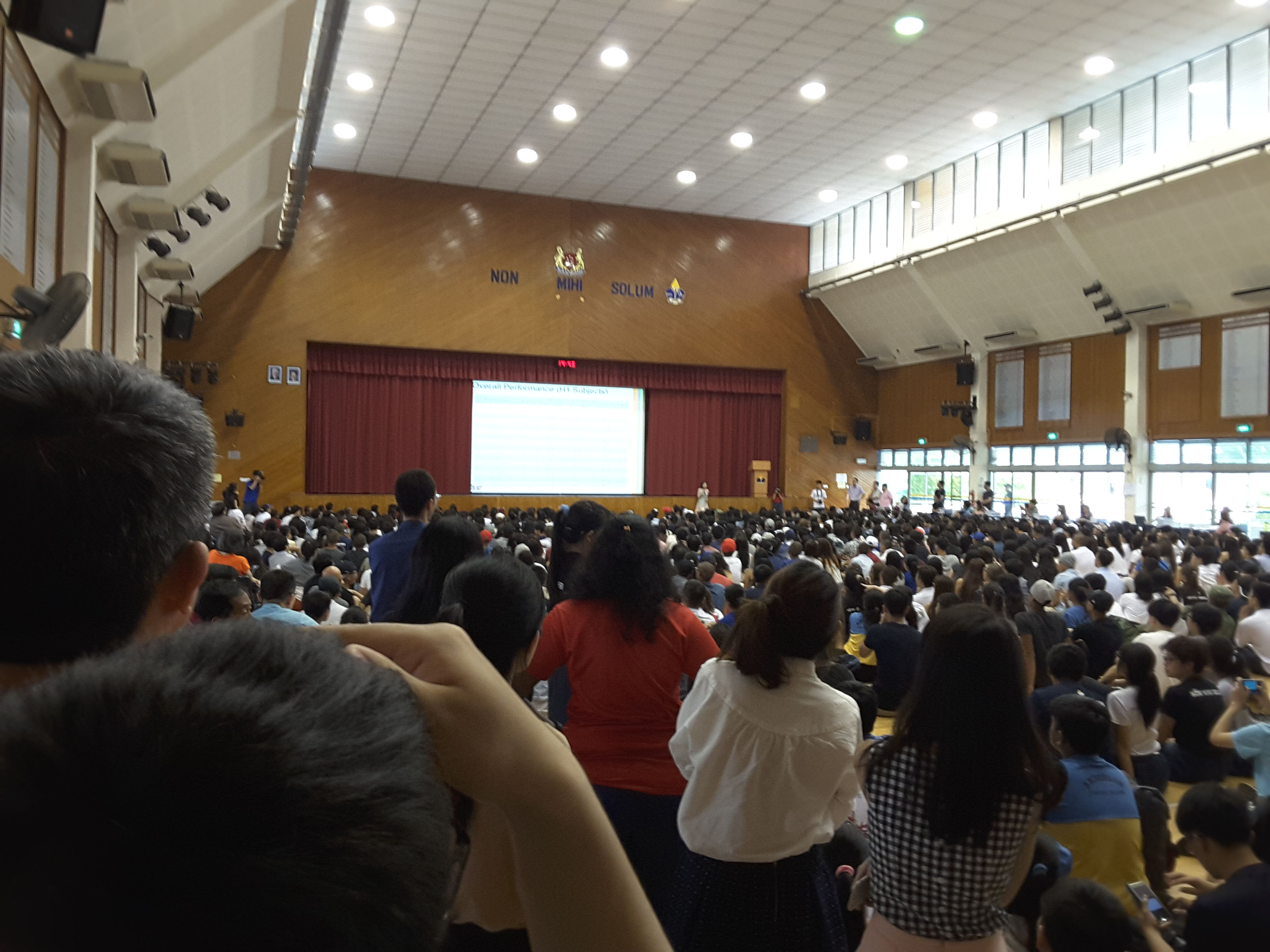
Hall of Anderson Junior College, at the release of results for the 2015 GCE Advanced Level examination.

College facilities	Classrooms and labs	Sports facilities	Aesthetics facilities
Air-Conditioned Hall; Multi-Purpose Hall; Auditorium; Lecture Theatres; Library; Reading Room; Nexus; Canteen	Classrooms; Container Classrooms; Computer Laboratories; Science Laboratories; Elementz Lab	Air Rifle Range; Basketball Courts; Volleyball Courts; Fitness Corner; Air-Conditioned Fitness Gym; Obstacle Course; Rock Wall; Soccer Field; Squash Courts; Tennis Courts; Track	Dance Studio; Choir Room; Band Room

=== Anderson Junior College Hostel ===
The Anderson Junior College Hostel was opened in 2012, providing accommodation for scholars in AJC as well as those from Nanyang Junior College, Anderson Secondary School, Nan Chiau High School and Catholic High School. It was permanently closed from 2019 as MOE announced that demand for boarding places continue to fall and there are fewer international students in schools in Singapore.

== Academic information ==
Anderson Junior College offers both Arts and Science courses that leads up to the Singapore-Cambridge GCE Advanced Level examinations.

== Co-curricular activities (CCA) ==
Tamil LDDS; Chinese Orchestra; Choir; Dance Society; Guitar Ensemble; Harmonica Band; Malay LDDS; StAJeWorks; Symphonic Band; Chinese LDDS	Badminton; Basketball; Hockey; Netball; Shooting; Football; Squash; Table Tennis; Tennis; Volleyball; Wushu; Frisbee	Audio Visual Aids Club (AVA); Climbing Club; Debate and Creative Communications (DCC); Interact Club; Outdoor Activities Club (ODAC); Photographic Society; Project Eureka; Red Cross Youth; Students' Council; Visual Arts Club; Strategist Society (Chess Club)

== Notable alumni ==
- He Ying Ying: Singaporean actress
- Jasmine Ser: Olympian (Shooting)
- Tay Kexin: Singer-songwriter
