= Don't Worry, Be Healthy =

- Also known as: Happy Goh Family (幸福住我家)
- 家有一保
- Genre: Family; Sitcom
- Created by: Cheong Yan Peng
- Written by: Tang Yeow; Seah Choon Guan
- Starring: Chew Chor Meng; Eelyn Kok; Chen Tianwen; Carrie Wong; Youyi
- Opening theme: 多爱一点 by Estella
- Country of origin: Singapore
- Original language: Mandarin
- No. of series: 1
- No. of episodes: 8

Production
- Producer: Leong Lye Lin
- Production location: Singapore
- Running time: approx. 23 minutes
- Production company: Mediacorp Studios

Original release
- Network: Mediacorp Channel 8
- Release: 16 February – 5 April 2016

Don't Worry, Be Healthy
- Traditional Chinese: 家有一保
- Simplified Chinese: 家有一保
Transcriptions
Standard Mandarin
- Hanyu Pinyin: Jîa yôu yī bâo

Don't Worry, Be Healthy (Chinese: 家有一保, previously titled Happy Goh Family) is a Singaporean Chinese sitcom which was commissioned by the Ministry of Communications and Information, sponsored by Pioneer Generation Package, and telecast on Singapore's free-to-air channel, Mediacorp Channel 8. It stars Chew Chor Meng, Eelyn Kok, Chen Tianwen, Carrie Wong and Youyi as the main casts of this series.

The sitcom began production on 15 October 2015 and made its debut on 16 February 2016 and ended on 5 April 2016. This sitcom consists of 8 episodes, and it was first screened on every Tuesday night at 8:00 pm.

== Plot ==
Wu Jiabao (Chew Chor Meng) and Cai Shumei (Eelyn Kok) live in a 5-room HDB flat with their parents and children. Jiabao is an honest gentleman who leads a simple life. He has been holding the position of an editorial assistant for many years. He puts his best foot in his career but never have the intention to claim credit for his hard work. He is a “foodie” and only food can make him act on impulse. Shumei is a part-time insurance agent who is eloquent and a planner. She enjoys watching Korean drama and tends to find Jiabao too pragmatic. They have a daughter, Mavis and a son, Manfred. Jiabao's father, Wu Dajiang (Zhang Wei) is a retiree and his mother, Chen Liniang (Li Yinzhu) is a homemaker. Both of them are from the pioneer generation who are open-minded and optimistic. They have been living with their single daughter, Jiaxin (Youyi) in the same neighbourhood as Jiabao and Shumei. On New Year's Eve, the chief editor is going to retire. Jiabao thought it would be an opportunity to be promoted to be the chief editor. However, the company had hired Elena (Carrie Wong) who had completed her studies overseas to fill the position. Jiabao was disappointed but when he realised Elena has no family in Singapore, he invited her to his house to have reunion dinner with his family. Dajiang and Liniang notice Jiaxin acting strangely and suspect that she has contracted cancer. They later learned that she is pregnant. She is worried that her boyfriend, Zida (Alfred Sim), who is a doctor, will not acknowledge the child she is carrying. Jiabao wanted to confront Zida but later found out that he did not pick up Jiaxin's call as he was busy in the operation theatre. He later proposed to Jiaxin publicly. After Jiaxin got married, she followed Zida who had been posted to work overseas. At the same time, Mavis had successfully got her scholarship to study overseas. All of a sudden, the house seems too quiet for Dajiang and Shumei. Both of them started visiting Jiabao and Shumei quite often. Dajiang has high blood pressure and heart disease. Liniang has diabetes and her joints are weak too. Shumei started to complain to Jiabao that Jiaxin used to be able to share the burden of the family but now it has solely become Jiabao's responsibility. On top of that, although Mavis is on a scholarship, Jiabao is still responsible for her living expenses. Jiabao comforts Shumei that the pioneer generation package will help to reduce the medical expenses greatly and told her not to worry...

== Cast ==
- Zhang Wei as Wu Dajiang
- Li Yinzhu as Chen Liniang
- Chew Chor Meng as Wu Jiabao
- Eelyn Kok as Cai Shumei
- Boon Hui Lu as Mavis Wu
- Gary Tan as Manfred Wu
- Youyi as Wu Jiaxin
- Alfred Sim as Chen Zida
- Chen Tianwen as Hong Maoqiang
- Le Yao as Huang Jinzhu
- Carrie Wong as Elena

== Episodes ==
No.	Title	Original release date
1	"Episode 1"	16 February 2016
2	"Episode 2"	23 February 2016
3	"Episode 3"	1 March 2016
4	"Episode 4"	8 March 2016
5	"Episode 5"	15 March 2016
6	"Episode 6"	22 March 2016
7	"Episode 7"	29 March 2016
8	"Episode 8"	5 April 2016

== See also ==
- List of MediaCorp Channel 8 Chinese drama series (2010s)
