= Tan Tiek Kwee =

Singaporean educator (1945–2014)

Tan as the principal of Raffles Institution.

Tan Tiek Kwee (Chinese: 陈德辉; December 1945 – 26 August 2014) was a Singaporean educator. He served as the principal of the Commonwealth Secondary School from 1987 to 1990, after which he was appointed the principal of the Victoria School. He remained there until he was transferred to Raffles Institution at the start of 1995, serving as headmaster there until his stepping down in 1998, after which he headed the Anderson Junior College for seven years before retiring.

== Early life and education ==
Tan was born in a village in the Klang District of Selangor in December 1945. He did not know his own birthdate as, in his hometown, "records of such things didn't matter." He grew up in poverty. His parents, who came from China, could not speak English. This brought them "much inconvenience" in their day-to-day lives in Klang, and so they sent Tan to receive an English education.

He received his primary education at the Klang Primary School there, and a teacher of his in this period who gifted him a badminton racket influenced him to choose to become a teacher himself. After class, he would go to a night school to learn Mandarin, an arrangement that continued up till his graduation from high school, after which his Chinese education ceased entirely. He attended the Klang High School, being the captain of the schools basketball, volleyball and badminton teams. In the 1960s, he then for a Bachelor of Science degree in pure and applied mathematics and a Diploma of Education at the University of Malaya, where he played badminton alongside Tan Aik Huang at the Inter-College Games.

== Career ==
Tan started as a teacher at the English College Johore Bahru in 1971. He remained there for just two years before emigrating to Singapore, joining the local Ministry of Education and being posted to the Chai Chee Secondary School shortly after. Tan taught mathematics and served as the discipline master. In 1975, on the encouragement of his colleagues, he sat for and performed well in the Chinese O-Level examinations. After four years at Chai Chee, Tan was transferred to the Temasek Junior College, where he headed the mathematics department. He was then promoted to the post of vice-principal of the junior college in 1984, serving under principal Eugene Wijeysingha, who later recalled that Tan "[gave] his job the utmost and [was] willing to make sacrifices", and that he would not "settle for just the status quo." His students there included architect Khoo Peng Beng.

=== Commonwealth Secondary School ===
Tan stepped down from Temasek Junior College at the end of 1986, and was posted to Commonwealth Secondary School (CWSS) as its headmaster from the start of the following year. When he took over, a survey of 300 students found that only three had enrolled in the school as their first choice. The school then had a "very serious discipline problem". He claimed to have spent around 80% of his initial time handling disciplinary and counselling matters. In this period, he felt more "like a counsellor" than a principal. During classtime, he would go to the nearby hawker centre to catch students who were skipping lessons. He claimed to have issued corporal punishment to over 60 students as principal.

To make CWSS more of a draw, he introduced extracurricular activities such as Chinese calligraphy, cooking classes for boys and technical education for girls. He went to the National Institute of Education and asked that some of the "better teachers" be sent to the school. Additionally, he began visiting various primary schools in the Jurong region to advertise CWSS in mid-1988. As the school was located in a "noisy" neighbourhood, he requested that it be relocated to a quieter site. There were then two newly erected school premises nearby that had yet to be put to use; one was in Jurong West and the other in Jurong East. He chose the latter, and the school moved there in 1989. In that year, CWSS had 700 students who had selected it as their first choice. By the time he stepped down from the school the following year, this number had risen to 1,200. He was succeeded as the headmaster of CWSS by Thomas Ong. From 1991 to 1993, CWSS rose from 122th to 29th place in the national school rankings; Ong attributed much of the school's success to Tan.

=== Victoria School ===
In 1990, Tan was transferred to the more reputable Victoria School (VS) as its principal, succeeding Nicholas Tang. He oversaw the construction of a new amphitheatre and the renovation of the entrance, which was to be "grand and distinctive" as part of his attempt to "forge a unique identity" for the school. He also initiated the school's attempt to go independent from the government under the Independent Schools Scheme, feeling that the school would otherwise fall behind those that had gone independent, being unable to "attract and retain the best teachers and students." However, VS was ultimately told by the Ministry of Education to stop their push for independence due to growing criticism of the increasing school fees at independent schools. The year after his transfer to VS, Tan was appointed to several "key" committees relating to the improvement of various aspects of education in the country.

He believed it crucial to "trust [his] teachers as professionals" and often "[left] things to their conscience." A teacher under him noted that when Tan "[asked them] to move one step, he [took] two steps himself. So it [was] hard to reject him." As principal, Tan was reportedly "so in love with sport he would be at every venue to see his team perform." His "concern for badminton" led him to engage former national badminton player and coach Cheong Cheng Swee as the coach to the school's badminton team. Under his tenure, the school saw success in athletics. He claimed to have "always inculcated in his school athletes regular doses of self-study and homework before their daily workouts." Additionally, he founded the school choir. VS also saw much success in academics under Tan's leadership, though Chua Chong Jin of The Straits Times noted that, to begin with, the school was a "natural magnet for the able and ambitious who need little pushing by teachers or principal." When the school faced a shortage of teachers, Tan returned to teaching.

On 7 October 1994, the chairman of the Raffles Institution's (RI) Board of Governors announced that Tan would be transferred to that school as headmaster at the end of the year. Tan Kiak Seng, then the principal of the Serangoon Garden Secondary School and a former vice-principal of Victoria Junior College, was selected as his successor at VS. From 1991 to 1994, the school rose from 15th to sixth place in the national school ranking, which he considered as his "proudest achievement".

=== Raffles Institution ===
Tan assumed the post of headmaster at RI, the "premier boys' school" in Singapore, on 1 January 1995. He succeeded Eugene Wijeysingha, who opined that Tan's inclination towards athletics would "go down well with RI boys and help him fit in." On taking office, Tan announced that he would be emphasising extracurricular activities as he believed the students "[needed] to get a few knocks and an informal education that they [would] never find in books." According to the Lianhe Wanbao, Tan may have been the first principal of the English-founded school to be able to read, write and fluently speak Chinese. The paper later opined that his appointment was representative of the growing trend of Chinese-educated principals being appointed to traditionally English schools in the country.

The school had slipped to third place in the rankings for the year before he took office, behind The Chinese High School. To ensure that the school would "remain at the highest level" in its performance and status, Tan arranged various exchange programmes with universities in New Zealand and Australia and extended the classtime for various subjects. The school had been underperforming in subjects such as Chinese, and Tan felt that this was due to the limited amount of classtime allocated to them. Additionally, the mid-year examinations for 1996 were abolished, and the teachers were instructed to use the mid-year period to instead give more lectures and finish the curriculum early such that students could begin on revision for their O-level examinations ahead of time. Tan felt that having examinations in the middle of the year were a waste of time, and that the time spent preparing and sitting for these exams should instead be used for regular lessons. He also introduced more speaking activities for graduating classes to help boost students' confidence.

RI regained the top spot on the 1996 ranking; this was attributed to his extension of classtime and his cancellation of the mid-year examinations. For the rest of his tenure, the school continued to perform well academically remained at the top of the ranking. As principal of RI, he oversaw the erection of a new boarding complex for the school, comprising five blocks with a capacity for 400 completed in 1996, and a $10 million four-storey extension to the school, completed in 1997. Tan announced in October 1998 that he would be stepping down as the principal at RI. He planned on returning to a government school after this, though he then "did not know which." He chose to leave then as he hoped to enjoy some time in paid leave before returning to work. Wong Siew Hoong, a previous principal of Tanjong Katong Secondary School, was selected as his successor. A student at RI under Wijeysingha and then Tan opined that the former had had a "better grasp of the importance of giving [the students] holistic development", whereas Tan "impressed upon [them] academic achievement as almost the be-all and end-all."

=== Anderson Junior College ===
Tan was then posted to the Anderson Junior College (AJC) as headmaster, succeeding Tan Teng Wah. He assumed the position at the start of 1999. At AJC, he was seen as a "respected mentor and visionary leader." He reportedly "set clear goals" for the school and introduced teaching methods that were more "student-centred" to encourage students to engage in self-learning. According to a vice-principal of AJC at the time, he "focused on students' skills and multifaceted development, rather than just rote learning."

In 2002, he conducted a survey which found that the school was underperforming in the subject General Paper, which had led to it ranking 14th among the junior colleges in the country. He then began "closely monitoring students' academic performance" in the subject, as well as grouping students who were performing poorly in the subject. These groups were then further divided, and they received regular one-on-one meetings with Tan and the college's vice-principal, during which he claimed he "[gave] them [their] utmost encouragement". The year after, the school rose to 8th place in the ranking. He was conferred the Public Administration Medal (Silver) at the 2004 National Day Awards for his contributions to education in the country. He retired from the post the year after.

== Personal life and death ==
Tan was married to a fellow educator whom he had met through a classmate of his in Klang. The couple had three children, two daughters and a son; his son enrolled in VS during his tenure as headmaster. Despite his "busy work schedule", he reportedly still "made time for his family". He attained Singaporean citizenship in 1981. He remained a "keen" sportsman and an "ardent" badminton player as schoolmaster. He was also an avid golfer. He was known to play sports and exercise with colleagues and students.

He retired in 2005 to spend more time with his family. In early 2013, Tan was diagnosed with late-stage pancreatic cancer. Despite medication and undergoing chemotherapy, his health continued to deteriorate, and he died of the disease at the Singapore General Hospital on 26 August 2014. The funeral was held at the Church of St Teresa, after which he was buried at the Christian cemetery at the Choa Chu Kang Cemetery.
