= William Scorpion =

William Thanakorn Scorpion
- Born: Thanakorn Scorpion; 14 November 1961 (age 64); Joo Chiat, Singapore
- Occupations: Singer, performance artist, equestrianism coach
- Years active: 1983–present
- Children: 2
- Musical career
- Origin: Singapore
- Genres: Cantopop, Mandopop

Thanakorn Scorpion (/ˈθɑːniəkɔːrn/ THAH-nee-ə-korn; born 14 November 1961), better known by his stage name William Scorpion, is a Singaporean Cantopop and Mandopop singer and equestrianism coach. He is widely viewed as a homegrown veteran of Singapore's Mandopop night-scene, often labelled as a local icon. The press continue to credit him as Singapore's Mandopop King, who brought this genre of music to prominence. In 2013, Scorpion resigned as Executive Director of Shanghai Dolly and left the club on 28 February 2013 so as to perform on an ad hoc basis and teach horse-riding in the day at the National Equestrian Centre. He launched his biography-travelogue, Sanuk Jing Jing Na!, at the club venue, Zouk, on 30 May to mark 30 years in show business.

== Biography ==
=== 1961–1982: Early life ===
Scorpion was born in the residential conservation area of Joo Chiat, a district in the eastern region of Singapore. He was born the eldest child into a family of four siblings, with him being the only son in a family of three younger sisters. He received his early education at Bukit Merah Primary School (now demolished) and his secondary education at Anderson Secondary School, before being enlisted into the Singapore Armed Forces, where he eventually vocationed as an Infantry section leader. After his consignment, he ventured into part-time modelling.

=== 1983–1992: Career beginnings ===
Scorpion's singing talent was only first discovered by a chance visit to a friend's club opening, called Gold Leaf Esteem Salon at Parklane Shopping Mall. When dared to sing on stage by his friends, he gamely took on the dare and sang a classic Cantopop ballad "上海滩" (Sheung Hoi Tan), the theme song from the popular Hong Kong period drama The Bund, originally sung by Frances Yip, in front of a live audience. His performance immediately impressed the club manager and he was offered a singing contract to perform at his club. Within 5 months, he had gained such a fan following and recognition from local music producers that he was offered a starring role in Channel 8's prime time (8:00 – 10:00 PM [UTC+08:00]) live Mandarin singing show, called Live at Studio One, produced by Studio One. It aired every weekday and he was a regular performer from 1983 to 1992. This wide exposure to the local Mandarin-speaking population helped secure his local fan base and increase his popularity.

In 1988, he embarked on a solo, three-night, sell-out, summer showcase concert in Guangzhou, China to promote the "Singapore-style" of Canto and Mandopop.

=== 1993–2005: Continued rise to prominence ===
Scorpion eventually became a crowd-drawing singing staple at many Cantopop-themed clubs, singing to nightly crowds at various night spots, including clubs/bars Canto, Club 1997, Club Chinos, Utopia and many others under the Europa Group. He eventually became the resident star and lead singer of Dragonfly, a Mandopop club situated in St James Power Station, a music and nightlife venue in the HarbourFront area of Singapore, near VivoCity. There, he performed together with a panoply of other local musical icons like Celest Zhang, Fatt Zhai, Jason Chung and Skye Sirena, as well as younger local reality stars such as Jon Toh (卓坊林) of Project SuperStar fame, and Sylvester Sim (沈祥龙), runner-up in the inaugural season of Singapore Idol.

=== 2006–2012: Shanghai Dolly ===
In 2009, Scorpion signed a renewed contract with the St. James Group, becoming the Executive Director of Shanghai Dolly, a new Mandopop club situated in the heart of Clarke Quay. The 1,600 sq m superclub was built as part of a $1-million St. James revamp. He acted as a mentor and guide to his bevy of younger singers, dancers, performers and DJs.

In late 2011, a competition was created to "find the next William Scorpion", called Guinness Live. Scorpion, representing Team Shanghai Dolly, mentored 4 acts (Aydan Ang, Benita Cheng, Jeremy Khoo and Regine Han), and these 4 acts competed against 8 others (4 from Team Dragonfly (Alvin Ng, Goh Yong Wei, Kenny Khoo and Phoebe Ong), mentored by Jason Chung, and 4 from Team Firefly (Alfred Sim, Howie Yeo, Willis Loye and Yee Si Ling), mentored by Fatt Zhai). Scorpion was also a judge for the competition. After 54 live shows, the finals were held on 17 March 2012, which culminated in the 12 finalists performing alongside veteran Mandopop acts Power Station (动力火车) and Liu Liyang (刘力扬). Team Firefly were the eventual champions, winning each member a winner's single.

=== 2013–present ===
Scorpion resigned as Executive Director of Shanghai Dolly on 15 February 2013 and he left the club on 28 February 2013, so as to perform on an ad hoc basis (corporate functions and events) as well as to teach equestrian during the day at the National Equestrian Centre Singapore. He launched his biography-travelogue on 30 May 2013, the first of its kind title for a local celebrity. Titled Sanuk Jing Jing Na!, the book celebrates three decades in show business as well as his frequent travels to Thailand. The book launch/live gig was held at critically acclaimed club venue, Zouk, on 30 May, where he performed with premier Chinese rock band, Queen Inc, and Scorpion's musician-daughter, Zsa Zsa Scorpion.

The book covers the challenges Scorpion faced in his entertainment career; how he stayed on top of the game; coming to terms with a tragedy after 15 years; his love for horses; and staying positive. The coffee-table book is written in English by well-known Singaporean entertainment journalist Ivan Lim and is published by Typewriter Books, an indie publisher of several best-selling books. The book project was a collaboration with the Tourism Authority of Thailand.

== Personal life ==
Scorpion married in 1985 and the couple had their first child, a daughter, Zsa Zsa, a year later in 1986, and a son, Nicholas, in 1989. Zsa Zsa has since followed in her father's footsteps and was formerly one half of local indie-folk music duo, Zsa & Claire, with band-mate, Claire Goh. Nicholas is an aspiring chef. Nicholas is currently setting up his own restaurant in Kuala Lumpur.

Scorpion holds an avid interest in equestrianism. He has worked with horses since 1988. He has earned an International Certification Horsemanship (Level 1) from The Equestrian Federation of Australia as well as Tertiary Studies in Horse Management and Riding. He has worked full-time as an equestrianism/horse-riding coach at The National Equestrian Centre, Bukit Timah Saddle Club in Singapore. He also currently holds a Federation Equestrian Internationale LEVEL 1 in General Coaching. Scorpion started his first proper riding lesson in 1989 with Mrs Lee Rhodes, a German national that based in Thailand since she was 8. Mrs Rhodes died at the age of 93 in Kanchanaburi on 14 November 2011 on Scorpion's 50th birthday. Through the training and dedication from Mrs Rhodes, Scorpion then decided to become a horse trainer, riding coach and horse rescue worker. Scorpion then trained with many elite equestrian trainers to establish his skills and experience.

He currently owns a horse rescue stable in Phayao, Northern Thailand. It comprises 12 stables for 12 horses, rooms for competent riders who wants to hone their riding skills. The rescue stable is solely run on Scorpion's personal funding and some fundings from friends and horse lovers.

Scorpion currently still returns to the stage to raise funds for this horse rescue projects.

Scorpion is fluent in Cantonese, English, Hakka, Hokkien, Mandarin and Thai.

== Bibliography ==
- Lim, Ivan (2013). William Scorpion : sanuk jing jing na : the biography of Singapore's Mandopop and Cantopop king in a journey through Thailand. Singapore. ISBN 978-981-07-5659-8. OCLC 852536813.
