= Tay Kexin =

Singaporean singer-songwriter

- 郑可心
- Born: 29 January 1988 (age 38); Singapore
- Education: Anderson Junior College; National University of Singapore
- Occupations: Singer, Emcee
- Years active: 2011–present
- Agent: Sparkle Live Music (co-founder)
- Spouse: Bernard Wee (m. 2023)
- Children: 2
- Relatives: Alfred Sim (brother-in-law)
- Family: Tay Kewei (sister)
- Awards: Breakthrough in Arts Award (2014)
- Musical career
- Genres: Pop; Rock
- Member of: MICappella

Chinese name
- Traditional Chinese: 鄭可心
- Simplified Chinese: 郑可心
Transcriptions
Standard Mandarin
- Hanyu Pinyin: Zhèng Kěxīn
- Website: taykexin.com

Tay Kexin (simplified Chinese: 郑可心; traditional Chinese: 鄭可心; pinyin: Zhèng Kěxīn; born 29 January 1988) is a Singaporean singer-songwriter. She is the younger sister of Tay Kewei. She is currently a member of the Asian Pop-rock vocal band MICappella. She is also an entrepreneur and the founder of Sparkle Live Music along with her elder sister Kewei and the keyboardist Lee Ein Ein.

== Career ==
Tay Kexin contested as a PK Challenger on Taiwan's Super Idol Season 5 in 2011 and was known as the “Jazz Queen” of Singapore. Her regular performance at Switch by Timbre had also amassed a fan following. Her versatility from sweet jazz numbers to high energy pop hits has since made her extremely popular on various occasions.

In March 2012, along with her elder sister Tay Kewei and keyboardist Lee Ein Ein, founded Sparkle Live Music, which was a premier live music provider for weddings and events in Singapore.

In December 2012, Tay released her own EP Get Set Go, in which she penned songs of positivity and new beginnings, which topped Singapore's CD-RAMA regional charts within the first week of sales. Her song, Prove Myself was also ranked no. 12 on MeRadio's 2012 Top 20 singles, and appeared as one of the soundtracks for Mediacorp Channel U’s hit drama show “Marry Me”.

In December 2013, Tay was appointed as a backing vocalist for David Tao's Concert World Tour and had traveled with him to perform at over 15 city states, including countries like China, Taiwan, Hong Kong, Malaysia etc.

In December 2014, Tay was invited to participate in the Youth Time 2014 Dialogue with the PM and other Youths at Anderson Junior College, her former junior college in Singapore and was awarded the Breakthrough in Arts Award by Prime Minister Lee Hsien Loong.

On 30 April 2015, Tay Kexin had emerged as one of the Top 10 contender in The Voice Of China Singapore competition.

== Personal life ==
In October 2022, Tay was engaged to her longtime partner and professional photographer Bernard Wee Shen, with the proposal on stage at MICappella concert. They were married in April 2023 with Tay wrote a love song Morning Kiss to celebrate her marriage. They sang the song at their wedding ceremony. Tay gave birth to a daughter on 7 January 2024. On 6 August 2026, Tay announced the birth of her second child, a son, in Instagram.
