= S2S (Japanese record label) =

S2S Private Limited
- Company type: International private company
- Industry: Music industry
- Founded: October 1997 in Singapore; 1999 in Japan
- Founder: Ken Suzuki
- Headquarters: Shibuya, Tokyo, Japan; Singapore
- Area served: Asia
- Key people: Ken Suzuki - Founder, Managing Director & CEO; Keisuke Sakurai - Director; Takashi Kazuki - Director; Dean Augustine - Director
- Products: CDs, DVDs
- Subsidiaries: BS Records; CitiKayak; HighDive; Incense Records; Major Chord Records; Smoove Records
- Website: S2S Official Website

S2S Pte. Ltd. was a Japanese record label founded by Ken Suzuki.

== History ==
S2S was founded and established in Singapore in October 1997 as an artist management and production house- S2S Pte Ltd. In 1999, S2S Inc, Japan was set up as a distribution, artist management and publishing company in Tokyo, Japan. S2S Pte Ltd is the head office for all business functions, such as the duties of communication, liaising and licensing on the behalf of S2S Inc, Japan. S2S Pte Ltd has managed to build a very strong network across Asia.

On September 30, 2015, S2S and its distribution arm, Sense Corporation, ceased operations in Singapore and the rest of South-east Asia, Hong Kong and Taiwan.

== Founder ==
Ken Suzuki was the founder of S2S. He was also one of the three founders of Avex Trax, Japan. Avex Trax is one of the most successful independent record labels in Japan.

== Talent Management ==
As an artiste management/production house and publishing company, S2S Pte Ltd and S2S Inc have signed several promising and talented artistes in both Japan and Singapore, to groom into stars. As the company has a close working relationship with several major record labels in Japan, their artistes have collaborated with many well-known producers and musicians in that territory. Hence, through their strong presence and business relations in Japan, their artistes have had songs released on singles, albums and compilations distributed by major retailers and distributors.

== Artistes ==
Name	Status
Princess	Singer
Sofia Källgren	Singer
Olivia Ong	Singer
MYMP	Singer
Alfred Sim	Singer
Tay Kewei	Singer
MICappella	Singer
Bonnie Loo	Singer & Actress
Pop Shuvit	Singer
Bevlyn Khoo	Singer
Rachelle Ann Go	Singer
Lani Misalucha	Singer
Charlie Green	Singer
Erik Santos	Singer

== Labels ==
‘INCENSE RECORDS’ – the label was formed to provide the sound to all the moods in your life. It is the home for Downtempo and Subtle, Nu Jazz, Electronica, Sexy House, Chilled Drum n’ Bass and Chillout releases. The concept and sound is, think sexy, funky and contemporary grooves that are designed and guaranteed to soothe but also to stimulate your aural senses.

‘HIGHDIVE MUSIC’ – Focuses on club music, dance, soul, R&B and rock and pop.

‘CITI KAYAK’ – Focuses on genres such as rock, hiphop and hardcore.

‘SMOOVE RECORDS’ – Focuses on broken beat, nu jazz, soul, funk, and house. One of the best selling albums from this label is Late Night Moods compilations. This series has been doing very well in Asia, and is recognized as a premier bossa nova chill album.

‘MAJOR CHORD RECORDS’ – Focuses on the adult contemporary sound and is targeted towards High Fidelity enthusiasts. The recording techniques and mastering processes of this label is tailored for discerning sound connoisseurs. Most Jazz artistes come under this label in the "Hi Fi Room presents" series.

"ABSOLUTE AUDIOPHILE" – Focuses on music for audiophile fanatics who value sound quality.

‘SENSE MUSIC’ – This company was formed on 1 August 2004 and is based in Singapore. Its primary function is to distribute all S2S CD releases and other CDs (from Japan) within Asia except Japan.

S2S ceased operations on 31 Sept 2015

== See also ==
- List of record labels
- Avex Group (Ken Suzuki's company from 1988 to 1997 and S2S' distributor in Japan)
