= Alfred Sim =

Singaporean singer and sports trainer (born 1981)

- Born: 4 October 1981 (age 45); Singapore
- Other name: Shen Zhihao
- Education: Edith Cowan University
- Occupations: Singer; athletics coach; actor
- Years active: 2014–present
- Spouse: Tay Kewei (m. 2015)
- Children: 3
- Awards: Best Theme Song – Star Awards; 2017
- Musical career
- Genre: Mandopop
- Labels: Cross Ratio Entertainment; S2S Pte. Ltd.

Chinese name
- Chinese: 沈志豪
- Hanyu Pinyin: Shěn Zhìháo

Alfred Sim Chee Hao (born 4 October 1981) is a Singaporean singer, athletics coach and occasional actor. He is best known for being the winner of the third season of reality singing competition Project SuperStar.

== Career ==
=== Musical ===
Sim auditioned for the first and second seasons of Project Superstar in 2005 and 2006 respectively, but he did not make it as one of the finalists.

In 2011, Sim became part of Sparkle Live Music, which was founded by singer Tay Kewei, her sister Tay Kexin, and keyboardist Lee Ein Ein, in which he performs songs at weddings. Sim also participated in Guinness Live, a competition "to find the next William Scorpion", representing Team Firefly, along with Howie Yeo, Willis Loye and Yee Si Ling, managed by Fatt Zhai. They were the eventual champions, winning each member a winner's single.

In 2013, Sim sung the theme song of television series The Journey: A Voyage, entitled 家乡 (Homeland). It was nominated as Best Drama Theme Song for MediaCorp's Star Awards 20.

In 2014, Sim took part in the third season of reality singing competition Project SuperStar, in which he received 52 percent of the public votes via the app Toggle Now, defeating Abigail Yeo's 48 percent. He won a $15,000 cash prize and a one-year MediaCorp contract.

In May 2015, Sim was invited to take part in the Singapore auditions for the fourth season of The Voice of China, and eventually won the auditions. He was unfortunately eliminated later on in the competition.

On 11 November 2015, Sim released his first single, "Lover", a cover of Beyond's song.

On 14 January 2016, Sim released his first EP "等到沈志豪".

On 27 February 2016, Sim headlined alongside Zhang Kefan, Allan Moo, Guan Dehui & Desmond Ng for the High 5 Power Concert at the Resorts World Theatre.

On 17 June 2016, Sim was a guest artist in his wife's Tay Kewei's solo concert "Chi".

In December 2016, Sim and Tay Kewei represented Singapore at the China-ASEAN Friendship Concert in Hainan, singing their original duet "以爱为豪".

Sim held his first solo concert "Huayi 华艺 Livehouse!" at the Esplanade Annex on 3 February 2017.

Sim was also selected to perform CHINGAY 2017 Theme Song "Rainbow in Our Hearts"

Sim represented Singapore at the Hong Kong Asian-Pop Music Festival 2017. He finished as overall Top 3 and managed to win the "Best Stage Performance" award.

In September 2017, Sim performed at the Stärker Music Carnival 2017 which headlined Taiwanese vocal powerhouse, A-Lin.

In March 2021, Sim held 'RE:BIRTH' concert together with Tay Kewei. at Sands Theatre.

=== Athletics ===
Sim completed his degree in Bachelor of Exercise and Sports Science at the Edith Cowan University. Since 2008, Sim has been a youth development coach for the Singapore Athletic Association, and has trained athletes such as Calvin Kang Li Loong, Shalindran Sathiyanesan and Joshua Lim. In 2010, Sim founded Reactiv, which specialises in training athletes.

Sim was awarded the POSB Everyday Champions Award 2009, organised by POSB Bank and Singapore Sports Council. In the same year, SSC awarded him with the High Performance Coaches Scholarship.

== Personal life ==
Sim married Tay Kewei in January 2015. Together, they have three sons.

== Filmography ==
=== Television series ===
Year	Title	Role	Network	Ref
2015	Crescendo	Singing competition host		
2016	Don't Worry, Be Healthy	Chen Zida		
2016	You Can Be an Angel 2			
2017	Dream Coder	Kay		
2021	Live Your Dreams (大大的夢想)			

== Discography ==
=== Extended plays ===
- Alfred 等到沈志豪 (2016)

=== Singles ===
Year	Title	Label
2015	以愛為豪 (with Tay Kewei)	S2S Pte. Ltd.
2015	Lover 情人	Cross Ratio Entertainment
2016	拨一通电话	Cross Ratio Entertainment
2017	双天至尊	Cross Ratio Entertainment
2017	一直都在	Cross Ratio Entertainment
2018	如歌	Cross Ratio Entertainment
2018	爱，存在 (with Tay Kewei)	Cross Ratio Entertainment
2018	默	Cross Ratio Entertainment
2020	墨墨爱着你 (with Tay Kewei)	Cross Ratio Entertainment
2021	从没想过	Cross Ratio Entertainment

=== Drama soundtrack ===
Year	Drama title	Song title	Notes
2013	The Journey: A Voyage	家乡	Main theme
2016	If Only I Could	最美的时光	Main theme
2017'	When Duty Calls	一直都在	Ending sub-theme
2017'	When Duty Calls	以为的以为 (Feat.Tay Kewei	Ending sub-theme
2018	Till We Meet Again (千年来说对不起)	弹指间 (Feat.Jocie Kok)	Main theme
2020	A Quest to Heal	王者 (feat. Ian Fang)	Sub theme
2021	CTRL	反话	Main theme
2022	My Star Bride - Hi, Mai Phương Thảo	从没想过	Sub theme
2023	My One and Only	取暖 (with Tay Kewei)	Main theme

== Awards and nominations ==
=== Star Awards ===
Star Awards
Year	Category	Nominated work	Result
Star Awards 2014	Best Theme Song	家乡	Nominated
Star Awards 2017	Best Theme Song	最美的时光	Won
Star Awards 2021	Best Theme Song	反话	Nominated
Star Awards 2024	Best Theme Song	取暖 (with Tay Kewei)	Nominated

=== Asian Television Awards ===
Asian Television Awards
Year	Category	Nominated work	Result
Asian Television Awards 2017	Best Theme Song	《最美的时光》	Nominated

Other Awards
Year	Ceremony	Category	Nominated work	Result
2022	27th Star Awards	Best Theme Song	CTRL	Nominated
2017	23rd Star Awards	Best Theme Song	If Only I Could	Won
2015	Voices of China (Singapore)	Champion	—N/a	Won
