= Commonwealth Secondary School =

- 立才中学; Sekolah Menengah Commonwealth

Location
- 698 West Coast Road, Singapore 608784; Singapore; 1.3189°N 103.7456°E

Information
- Type: Autonomous co-educational
- Motto: Ever with the Best
- Established: 1964; 62 years ago
- Session: single
- School code: 3012
- Principal: Jeremy Ang (Mr)2023-
- Enrolment: Over 1,300
- Colour: Blue Yellow White
- Website: commonwealthsec.moe.edu.sg

Commonwealth Secondary School (abbreviation: CWSS) is a government, autonomous and coeducational secondary school in Jurong East, Singapore. Founded in 1964, Commonwealth Secondary School offers secondary school education which leads to the Singapore-Cambridge GCE Ordinary Level or Singapore-Cambridge GCE Normal Level examination.

The brand new campus at West Coast Road

== Tanglin Secondary School ==
Commonwealth Secondary School began as Tanglin Integrated Vocational Secondary School in 1964 and became an academic institution named Tanglin Secondary in 1969.

In 1972, the name was changed again to Commonwealth Secondary School since it was situated near Commonwealth Drive. The school relocated to Jurong East in 1989 and functioned as a neighbourhood school in the Hong Kah constituency for seven years before moving to Jurong East Street 24 of the Yuhua Constituency at the end of 1995. The school moved to its new campus on West Coast Road in November 2006. The official opening ceremony of the new campus was held on 11 July 2008.

Commonwealth Secondary has been an autonomous school since 1995, a status given to the school because of its academic success and achievement in co-curricular programmes. Commonwealth Secondary is also a Higher Chinese Centre since 1995, catering to students who have the passion to pursue Higher Chinese Language (HCL) in the West District. On the academic front, in addition to being a Higher Chinese Centre, Commonwealth has also been offering Higher Malay and Higher Tamil to its pupils since 2006. From 2006, a humanities subject, Economics, was offered to Secondary 3 students. Dance and Drama has been Commonwealth's niche areas since 2000. The Walk in Art Gallery has been open since the school itself opened in 1993. In 2004, Commonwealth received its 1st Ministry of Education's Sustained Achievement Award for both uniformed groups and the performing arts.

The school has been designated as a Centre of Excellence for Environmental Education from 2008 onwards.

== Present ==
In 2007, Commonwealth Secondary School received the Singapore Quality Class status. In March of the same year, Pandan Reservoir and Sungei Pandan were adopted by the school. In 2008, Commonwealth Secondary School was designated as a Centre of Excellence for Environmental Education.

Commonwealth Secondary School was accorded the School Distinction Award by the Ministry of Education in 2010 in recognition for its all round excellence in education.

== Principal ==
Name of principal	Years served
Boey Chen Kee	1969–1970
N. Suppiah	1971–1974
A. N. Balagopal	1975–1986
Tan Tiek Kwee	1987–1990
Thomas Ong Xian Wei	1990-1993
Sun Huey Min	1993–1998
Lim Lai Cheng	1999–2001
Dorothy Tay Bee Hian	2002–2004
Teo Khin Hiang	2005–2008
Cheah Mei Ling	2009–2012
Aaron Loh	2012–2017
Ng Boon Kiat	2018–2022
Jeremy Ang	2023–present

== Identity and culture ==
=== School crest ===
The CWSS Crest, designed by Ruth Ng

This is the school's statement on the CWSS crest:

=== Motto ===
Ever With The Best

== Academic information ==
Being a government secondary school, Commonwealth Secondary School offers three academic streams, namely the four-year Express course, as well as the Normal Course, comprising Normal (Academic) and Normal (Technical) academic tracks.

=== O Level Express Course ===
The Express Course is a nationwide four-year programme that leads up to the Singapore-Cambridge GCE Ordinary Level examination. Commonwealth Secondary School had consistently stellar performances in the Singapore-Cambridge GCE Ordinary Level examinations. In 2007, 99.5% of the graduating students are eligible for Junior College, and the school was one of the few with students scoring 7A1s and above.

==== Academic subjects ====
The examinable academic subjects for Singapore-Cambridge GCE Ordinary Level offered by the school for upper secondary level (via. streaming in secondary 2 level), as of 2017, are listed below.

Notes:

1. Subjects indicated with ' * ' are mandatory subjects.
2. All students in Singapore are required to undertake a Mother Tongue Language as an examinable subject, as indicated by ' ^ '.
3. "SPA" in Pure Science subjects refers to the incorporation of School-based Science Practical Assessment, which 20% of the subject result in the national examination are determined by school-based practical examinations, supervised by the Singapore Examinations and Assessment Board. The SPA Assessment has been replaced by one Practical Assessment in the 2018 O Levels.

Sciences	Language & Humanities	Arts & Aesthetics
Additional Mathematics*; Mathematics*; Physics (SPA); Chemistry (SPA)*; Biology (SPA); Science (Combined)	English Language*; English Literature; Mother Tongue Language* ^; Higher Mother Tongue Language; Geography; History; Combined Humanities (Social Studies & another Humanities subject at elective level)*	Art; Design & Technology; Food & Nutrition; Music

=== Normal Course ===
The Normal Course is a nationwide 4-year programme leading to the Singapore-Cambridge GCE Normal Level examination, which runs either the Normal (Academic) curriculum or Normal (Technical) curriculum, abbreviated as N(A) and N(T) respectively.

==== Normal (Academic) Course ====
In the Normal (Academic) course, students offer 5–8 subjects in the Singapore-Cambridge GCE Normal Level examination. Compulsory subjects include:

- English Language
- Mother Tongue Language
- Mathematics
- Combined Humanities

A 5th year leading to the Singapore-Cambridge GCE Ordinary Level examination is available to N(A) students who perform well in their Singapore-Cambridge GCE Normal Level examination. Students can move from one course to another based on their performance and the assessment of the school principal and teachers.

==== Normal (Technical) Course ====
The Normal (Technical) course prepares students for a technical-vocational education at the Institute of Technical Education. Students will offer 5–7 subjects in the Singapore-Cambridge GCE Normal Level examination. The curriculum is tailored towards strengthening students' proficiency in English and Mathematics. Students take English Language, Mathematics, Basic Mother Tongue and Computer Applications as compulsory subjects.

=== Centre of Excellence for Design and Innovation ===
Commonwealth Secondary is a Centre of Excellence for Design and Innovation, providing students with professional development in Design Thinking and Maker Education as ways to develop joy of learning and entrepreneurial skills in students.

=== Environmental education ===
In 2001 the school started a Green Club. One of the projects was the adoption of the mangrove boardwalk trail in the Sungei Buloh Wetland Reserve as part of the Adopt-A-Park Scheme launched by the National Parks Board.

In 2006, the staff endorsed the goal of working towards becoming a Centre of Excellence for Environmental Education. A group of teachers was identified to develop a customised environmental education curriculum for the school, starting with the Secondary One students in 2007. 2006 also saw the school clinching the Lotus Award in the Singapore Environment Council's Green Audit. In 2007, the school was designated a Centre of Learning for Environmental Education for the West 7 cluster. The school converted the school pond into a Constructed Treatment Wetland to recycle used water to water the plants in the school compound. Commonwealth Secondary School became the Centre of Excellence for Environmental Education in 2008.

On 28 March 2014, the school celebrated Earth Hour with The Amazing Spider-Man 2 cast, Andrew Garfield and Jamie Foxx. It was a significant milestone for the school because it is the first time Hollywood came to Commonwealth. The two superstars not only interacted with the 1400-strong audience, they also did their part for the environment by planting a sugar apple and giant lemon bush in the school's Gift of Life Garden. It was a befitting way for the school to kick start her 50th Birthday celebrations.

== Co-curricular activities (CCAs) ==
Commonwealth Secondary's CCA programme comprises sports, uniformed groups, aesthetic groups, clubs and societies.

In 2003 CWSS attained gold medals in the biannual Singapore Youth Festival (SYF) Central Judging in all five of its aesthetic groups (Band, Choir, Drama, Chinese dance, Indian dance). In 2005, these groups attained two Gold with Honours and three Golds in the SYF Central Judging. The newly formed Malay Dance Group won a silver award in the SYF.

The Choir team was selected as the only choir to perform on the Opening Ceremony of the Singapore Youth Festival at the Esplanade Theatre on 1 July 2005. The Drama team performed for the SYF at the Hwa Chong Institute Drama Theatre on 22 July 2005. In March 2006, the performing arts group held its first public performance 'Leaving a Legacy' at the Esplanade - Theatres on the Bay. 2009 was a record-breaking year for the school, with three aesthetic groups attaining the highest accolade, Gold with Honours.

The hockey team was ranked among the top eight schools in Singapore for the third year running. The netball team achieved 2nd position in West Zone Netball B Girls in the year 2006 and champions in the M1 School Challenge League 2009.

The National Cadet Corps of CWSS had maintained high standards for the past years, attaining gold award for unit performance in 2005, 2008 and 2009. The Red Cross units won gold medals in the Best Unit Awards 2005. The Red Cross Unit was awarded the Community Service Gold Award for the 4th consecutive Year, c. 2006. The Girls' Guides had consistently been attaining Gold and Silver for unit performance.

The AVA team won the Silver and Special Mention Award in the 6th SVA and the FnV team have obtained Merit in the 8th SVA. The New Media Club achieved Gold in the 2008 Schools' Digital Media Award. The school won the Lotus award in Green Audit Awards in years 2006, 2007 and Sustained Achievement Award in 2008 with the help of Green Club. The Art and Craft club won Bronze awards in SYF 2006 and 2008.

== Parent-teacher network ==
All parents are automatically members of the PTN. They have the right to vote and the right to hold office in the society. The PTN office bearers meet regularly and are involved in the school activities.

Members of PTN are involved in planning school events such as a funfair, and the seniors' graduation night.

== Notable alumni ==
- Joseph Prince – Senior pastor of New Creation Church in Singapore.
