= Tay Kewei =

Singaporean singer-songwriter (born 1983)

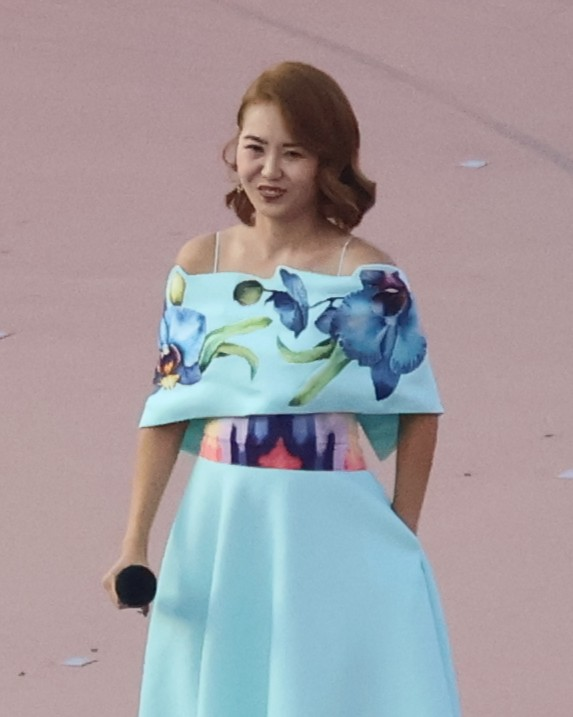
- Tay in 2025
- Born: 18 August 1983 (age 43); Singapore
- Education: Raffles Girls' School (Secondary); Hwa Chong Junior College
- Alma mater: Nanyang Technological University
- Occupation: Singer-songwriter
- Years active: 2009–present
- Spouse: Alfred Sim (m. 2015)
- Children: 3
- Family: Tay Kexin (sister)
- Musical career
- Genres: Pop; Jazz; Chinese Classical
- Labels: Cross Ratio Entertainment; S2S Pte. Ltd.

Chinese name
- Traditional Chinese: 鄭可為
- Simplified Chinese: 郑可为
- Hanyu Pinyin: Zhèng Kěwéi
- Website: www.taykewei.com

Tay Kewei (born 18 August 1983) is a Singaporean singer-songwriter. She has released songs in English, Chinese and Japanese.

== Career ==
In 2006, Tay Kewei joined local singing competition Project SuperStar, initially getting into the top 24, but having to withdraw eventually due to conflicting gig schedules. After that, she decided to pursue a career in music, and became a background vocalist, duet partner, and erhu player for Chinese pop stars, including Wang Lee Hom, David Tao, A-Mei and JJ Lin assisting them on international tours.

In 2009, she released an indie EP with keyboardist Lee Ein Ein, entitled KEEP!. Promotional tours were held in several countries, including Hong Kong, Taiwan and Malaysia. Khalil Fong appeared as a surprise guest in the Hong Kong performance.

In May 2009, Tay Kewei signed with S2S Pte Ltd. Her debut label album, Come Closer With... Kewei was released in September 2010, with four original songs in English and Chinese, as well as a bilingual duet with Filipino singer Christian Bautista. The album was promoted regionally in Korea, Japan, Hong Kong, Taiwan, Thailand, Indonesia and Malaysia. Her debut album launch concert was held at the Esplanade Recital Hall, and sold out.

In 2011, she announced that work had begun on her new album, and previewed her new single "Fallin", in her December public performances. She was also nominated for the Most Popular Newcomer and Best Local Artiste in the YES 933 Singapore Hit Awards.

In May 2011, Tay Kewei was appointed as an Intellectual Property ambassador for the Intellectual Property Office of Singapore, alongside Dick Lee. She was also chosen as the Singaporean representative at the Hong Kong Asian Pop Music Festival's Super Nova Awards.

In February 2012, she released her second album, Fallin.

In June 2014, she recorded and released PIANO BALLADS featuring Kewei exclusively in Japan, which topped the charts in the first week of its release. The album maintained a top three position in the Top 100 Overall Charts and reached number three on the Rock/Pop charts for two consecutive weeks.

In August 2014, Tay made her stage debut in original musical Innamorati by Toy Factory Productions, which features 12 songs sung by Eric Moo, along with 6 other singers including Wong JingLun, Bonnie Loo and Sugie Phua.

She was also involved in Singapore's 49th National Day Parade, the largest scale national show that was broadcast live on television. She was interviewed on Good Morning Singapore with the Chairman of the Show Committee Colonel David Neo, and Chief Choreographer of People's Association Mr Tay Poh Soon. She was also featured in the official music video for the theme song of National Day Parade 2014, for the song "One People One Nation One Singapore x We Will Get There".

On 15 September 2014, Tay released her first original Mandarin album, Turn Back and Smile. Out of the 10 songs in the album, nine of them are written by Kewei. In the music video of her first single "Heart Shaped Void", Taiwan's budding actor, Allen Chen, was specially invited to act as the main lead of a man in modern times with a violent tendency that you can't help but hate and can't help but love. The music video is full of dramatic tension; despite not having much acting experiences, the outstanding emotional performance in the MV is a big breakthrough for Kewei.

During end September 2014, Kewei flew over to Bangkok to shoot a music video for her second single, "Hopeless". Midway through the shoot at Suan Luang rama IX Park, Kewei was injured and was immediately sent to the hospital.

Tay's new album, Turn Back and Smile, achieved impressive sales performance and has topped the chart of Singapore's biggest CD retail store - CD RAMA's Top 10 Chart for a couple of weeks.

In December 2014, she was cast as female lead in theatre production "Window In The Sky", acting against veteran actor Peter Yu, as the wife of a cancer-stricken man who was eventually healed by the power of prayer.

For SEA Games 2015, she recorded and performed "Wonderful" as one of the Songs of the Games at the Singapore Sports Hub, together with Gayle Nerva and Tabitha Nauser.

In January 2015, Mediacorp Channel 5 launched a brand new look and content, and Kewei was commissioned to write the new theme song for the channel, and she penned the music and lyrics for "Good To Be Home".

She also sang the theme song for Mediacorp Channel 8's drama series "You Can Be Angel Too" called "Ai Yi Zhi Dou Zai", broadcast in January 2015.

In February 2015, she joined the Finished With Fins campaign to pledge against consumption of shark's fin.

In March 2015, she sang for the gala premiere of Disney movie Cinderella at the Mastercard Theatre at Marina Bay Sands.

In April 2015, she sang for Singapore Day in Shanghai, at the memorial concert of Lee Kuan Yew, together with Dick Lee, Lee Weisong, Lee Sisong, Roy Li, Hossan Leong, Sebastian Tan and many other Singapore talents.

In May 2015, she and Nathan Hartono hosted a series for Temasek Presents Jubilee at the Botanics, and she performed with Singapore Chinese Orchestra at the Botanic Gardens for a 3000 strong crowd.

In June 2015, her television debut was for Channel U's docu-drama series "Wo Yao De Xing Fu" (Blissful Living), playing a university student who dreamt of being a singer.

In July 2015, she and her husband Alfred Sim both made it to the final rounds of The Voice of China, but were not selected by the judges.

In July 2015, she represented Singapore to perform at the Chengdu International Sister Cities Youth Music Festival, with cultural acts from all over the world.

In August 2015, she and her husband Alfred Sim sang for Mediacorp's The Gift of Song "These Are The Days" for SG50, together with Farisha Ishak, Shabir, Sufie Rashid and Julie Tan, and performed the song at the 20th Compass Awards.

In October 2015, she acted in her first English musical production "Beauty World", directed by Dick Lee, as cabaret girl Lily.

In November 2015, she inks new record deal with Cross Ratio Entertainment.

In December 2015, she represented Singapore for the China-ASEAN Friendship Concert in Beijing, and sang a bilingual version of "Home", written by Dick Lee.

In May 2016, she starred in her first short film "To Another Me" by Temasek Polytechnic Final Year students, which was screened at the Singapore Discovery Centre in the "Singapore Stories" series.

In May 2016, she performed at the Sentosa Ukulele Festival together with Daniel Ho, Sungha Jung and many other renowned ukulele players.

In May 2016, she performed for SKII's Mother's Day VIP Event at the South Beach Hotel.

In May 2016, she was awarded Ten Outstanding Young Persons Award by Junior Chamber International (JCI) Singapore under Cultural Achievement.

In June 2016, she held her long-awaited concert at the prestigious Esplanade Concert Hall, and graced the front page of Business Times. The concert was called "Chi", and it was almost 7 years since her last full-length ticketed show. Almost a thousand people turned up for the concert. It was presented by Peugeot and Starker Music. Fillory and The Facade were the opening acts, and Bonnie Loo, Alfred Sim and Kewei's father (who played the Chinese flute) were the guest artistes of the concert.

She also released her 5-track EP "CHI" and single "Qi Nian Zhi Yang" as the theme song for the concert.

In July 2016, she was part of Mediacorp Channel 5's original reality production "My Squad Is Better Than Yours", and was leader of Team KITA, consisting of artistes Tosh Zhang, Inch Chua and Aisyah Aziz. There were 3 other teams of 4 artistes each, and the 8-episode series saw them competing to win the Ultimate Squad title each week based on their song-and-dance performances. Kewei's solo performances included playing the erhu and singing "True Colours", as well as dueting "Kiss from a Rose" with Alfred Sim.

In July 2016, she and Alfred Sim were selected to sing for Lianhe Zaobao's theme song as part of their revamp, and the song "Zhao Hui Na Gan Jue" is written by Liang Wenfu.

In August 2016, she sang the theme song for Mediacorp Channel 8 drama series "Dream Job", called "Xue Hui".

In September 2016, she performed for the annual MILK Charity Dinner at Shangri-La Hotel.

In September 2016, she performed for Tag Heuer x F1 Redbull event at ION Orchard alongside Hong Kong superstar Gem Tang.

In September 2016, she performed at Starker Music Festival alongside Ding Dang.

In September 2016, she released her EP in Hainan as part of her EP promotional tour.

In December 2016, she and Alfred Sim represented Singapore at the China-ASEAN Friendship Concert in Hainan, singing their original duet "YI Ai Wei Hao".

On 27 May 2017, Tay Kewei was part of a line-up for the grand opening of the Singapore Chinese Cultural Centre.

On 18 June 2017, Tay Kewei and Alfred Sim was featured in "Billboard Rockx III" organised by the Nanyang Polytechnic Chinese Orchestra.

Tay Kewei was part of the line up for Experience ASEAN Festival that lasted from 12 to 14 January 2018.

Tay Kewei was part of the line up of special guests for Hong Kong Asian-Pop Music Festival 2018 with her previous encounter being back in 2011 when she was selected to represent Singapore to compete for the Asian Supernova Award.

== Personal life ==
Tay married Alfred Sim in January 2015. Together, they have three sons.

== Discography ==
=== Studio albums ===
Date of release	Title
8 September 2010	Come Closer With... Kewei
14 February 2012	Fallin
28 May 2014	Piano Ballads featuring Kewei ～Jazz Covers Collection～
15 September 2014	Turn Back & Smile
24 September 2014	Natural Soul
10 August 2016	Chi (七年之氧)
23 April 2021	Why Don't You Let Go

=== Extended plays and singles ===
Date of release	Title
16 December 2009	KEEP! EP
21 August 2012	真善美 – Single (Feat.Chriz Tong 汤微恩) (Opening Theme Song For Don't Stop Believin 我们等你)
7 October 2012	说 – Single
29 March 2013	Starting Now (優頻道_創!_主題曲) – Single
25 August 2014	心型空洞 – Single
4 January 2015	以愛為豪 – Single (with Alfred Sim)
14 November 2015	Like I'm Gonna Lose You – Single (with Alfred Sim)
17 August 2016	学会 – Single" (Sub-Theme Song For The Dream job 绝世好工)
22 November 2016	天天想你 － Single (Featured in Lulu The Movie)
19 June 2017	双天至尊 – Single (with Alfred Sim)
12 February 2018	恋爱3部曲 – Single
19 March 2018	胜利在闪耀 － Single
11 October 2018	ASEAN with Love － Single (with Azariah Tan)
25 October 2018	愛，存在 — Single (with Alfred Sim)
21 December 2018	雪落下的聲音 x 雙影 — Single (with Chriz Tong 汤微恩)
6 December 2019	念念不忘 — Single
8 January 2020	墨墨愛著你 — Single (with Alfred Sim)
12 November 2021	Not Alone
July 2023	"Qu Nuan" (with Alfred Sim)

=== Others ===
Date of release	Title	Songs
March 2003	新谣节03纪念专辑	一厢情愿
November 2004	黄烈传 – 24小时	爱你的感觉 duet with Tay Kewei
24 July 2005	新谣节05纪念专辑	心的感觉 / Love Is All We Need
21 August 2009	陶喆 – Opus 69	Play
29 March 2010	THE BEST OF S2S EXTRAVAGANZA	Baby Now That I Found You
8 April 2013	Oriental Jazz 東方爵士	親密愛人 / 聽說愛情回來過 / 雖然我願意 / 流沙 / 影子 / 城裡的月光 / 流淚手心

=== Music chart ===
Year	Title	Chart	Chart position
Sept-Nov 2014	Album <<转身微笑>>	Singapore CD-RAMA Overall Charts	No.1
June 2014	Digital Album <<Piano Ballads feat Kewei>> (Exclusively for Japan only)	Japan Eonkyo Charts	No.1
Mar 2012	Album <<Fallin'>>	HMV Hong Kong Jazz / Easy Listening Chart	No.8
May 2011	Song "This too Shall Pass"	Taiwan Pop Radio 91.7FM	No.7
April 2011	Song "This too Shall Pass"	Hong Kong Metro Info FM99.7	No.5
Mar 2011	Song "This too Shall Pass"	Hong Kong RTHK 3	No.3
Mar 2011	Song "This too Shall Pass"	Hong Kong RTHK 2	No.8
Dec 2010	Song "This too Shall Pass"	Malaysia 98.8 FM	No.18
Dec 2010	Song "This too Shall Pass"	Malaysia ONE FM	No.6
Oct 2010	Song "This too Shall Pass"	Singapore YES 93.3 FM 醉心龙虎榜	No.1
Feb 2010	Song "This too Shall Pass"	Taiwan ICRT	No.5
Nov 2010	Album <<Come Closer with.. Kewei>>	Taiwan ESLITE Jazz Chart	No.3
Oct 2010	Album <<Come Closer with.. Kewei>>	HMV Hong Kong Jazz / Easy Listening Chart	No.3
Oct 2010	Album <<Come Closer with.. Kewei>>	HMV Hong Kong International Chart Top 40	No.9
Sep 2010	Album <<Come Closer with.. Kewei>>	HMV Singapore Jazz Chart	No.2
Nov 2010	Single 你还不知道？	YES 933 醉心龙虎榜	No.1

== Theatre ==
Year	Chinese title	English title	Role
2014	唯一	Innamorati	Wei En
2015	—N/a	Beauty World	Lily
2015	天窗	Window In The Sky	Ashley Low

== Awards and nominations ==
Award	Category	Result
Singapore Hit Awards 2010	Best Newcomer	Media Choice Winner
Singapore Hit Awards 2011	Best Local Artiste Award	Nominated
Singapore Hit Awards 2011	Most Popular Newcomer Award	Nominated
Singapore Hit Awards 2011	Most Popular Local Singer	Nominated
Star Awards 2013	Best Drama Theme Song	Nominated
