= Vocaluptuous =

Singaporean a cappella group

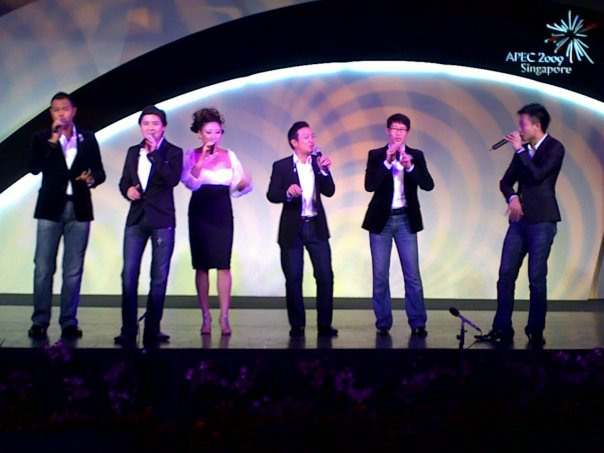
- Vocaluptuous performing at The Esplanade for APEC Singapore 2009. From left to right: Hazrul Nizam, Gerald Tan, Simone Khoo, John Lee, Sam Kan, and Timothy Huang.

Background information
- Origin: Singapore
- Genres: Pop, Jazz, A cappella, Rock
- Instrument: voice
- Years active: 1997–present
- Members: Hazrul Nizam; John Lee; Hwang Kai Wen; Genevieve Seah; Takuma Tanaka; Michael Liew
- Past members: Tan Lay Hoon; Angelina Choo; James Kenneth Koh; Joel Lim; Michael Ho; Hubie Ordoyo; Sam Kan; Horace Hutapea; Tan Chin Keong; Simone Khoo; Gerald Tan; Philip Poh; Rupert Ong; Shimona Kee; Simon Ong; Alfred Tan; Timothy Huang; Sarah-Kei Lauw; Chong Wai Lun
- Website: www.vocaluptuous.com.sg

Vocaluptuous is a vocal group from Singapore, known primarily for its a cappella deliveries and a distinctly unique Singaporean identity with original songs. The group currently consists of tenor Hazrul Nizam, baritone/music director John Lee, vocal percussionist/tenor Kai Wen Hwang, soprano Genevieve Seah, tenor Takuma Tanaka, and bass Michael Liew.

== History ==
=== Formation ===
Vocaluptuous was formed in 1997 by Andy Quek, the resident arranger and music director who was also responsible for general national awareness of contemporary a cappella music locally and a series of concerts featuring various Singaporean groups titled Aka A Cappella. The original line-up featured 9 singers.

=== Evolution ===
Throughout the course of its history, there have been dramatic changes in the group's line-up due to personal commitments. The group's development can be tracked through its style of music. Since its inception, it has gone from its doo-wop, pop and rock roots to a contemporary a cappella group and, presently, a vocal group identified by its stylistic musical approach: Lush, Pop, Jazz.

== Musical style ==
Known for its versatility and eclectic repertoire, Vocaluptuous has performed jazz standards, bossa nova, pop and even rock numbers. In recent years, it has also distinguished itself with a repertoire of original songs that prominently feature the Singaporean culture and lifestyle, even fusing traditional local folk songs. This was a result of John Lee, resident composer and arranger, and his siblings' strong desire to establish a unique local flavour that Singaporeans all over the world will be able to relate to, a goal that was largely championed by John's elder brother, Dick Lee, who has also written songs for Vocaluptuous.

== Performances ==
Since the group's debut in Aka A Cappella II, the group has continued to perform in subsequent concerts in the series. In 1999, Vocaluptuous was included in Action Theatre's First 42 Theatre Festival, headlining what is touted as Singapore's first a cappella musical: “No Strings Attached”. The success of the group's foray into theatre led to its very own self-written musical concert the following year. “We Don’t Dance” featured a fictitious origin story in the first half of the show, culminating in a concert in the second half. The concert was a 3-night sold-out event.

The group has appeared in many notable high-profile events for both local and international audiences, including the Heritage Festival, President's Challenge, the 100th Anniversary of Eden Hall for HRH Prince Andrew, Duke of York, APEC Singapore 2009 and the first Singapore Grand Prix.

In 2004, for the opening of The Arts House at the Old Parliament, Vocaluptuous opened for the headline act, Italian group Neri Per Caso, and also performed two collaborative songs with them. In 2006, Vocaluptuous performed at the Mosaic Music Festival as an opening act to Paquito D'Rivera and The New York Voices. 2006 also saw the group's second solo concert, Lush Pop Jazz, lasting eight shows at the Esplanade, with local politician and entertainer, Eunice Olsen.

In 2009, Vocaluptuous was featured as one of the key performers at the National Day Parade and remains the first a cappella group to end the parade with an original rendition of Majulah Singapore, the national anthem arranged by Dr Sydney Tan, with an a cappella opening.

As part of the Total Defence Day in 2011, a revised version of popular national song "Home" was recorded and filmed as a music video, and featured 39 local artistes including Kit Chan, Stefanie Sun, JJ Lin, Dick Lee and Vocaluptuous. Vocaluptuous has also been featured in Dream Academy's Crazy Christmas variety show/concert series for three years.

In December 2012, Vocaluptuous held two sold-out concerts titled "Very Merry Happy" under the Late Nite Series organised by the Esplanade. This also marked the official launch of their second Christmas album titled "Tis the Season".

=== Overseas Performances ===
Vocaluptuous' first major overseas performance was to Taiwan as a featured act in the Asian A Cappella Festival 2005, staging showcases in both Taipei and Kaohsiung. The group was invited to perform in Japan by the Singapore Tourism Board in 2007 and 2008, for the Food Festival in Tokyo and the Singapore Fair in Fukuoka respectively. Also in 2008, Vocaluptuous was featured at the Singapore Day event in Melbourne, Australia.

In March 2013, Vocaluptuous performed at the National Museum of Korea in Seoul to launch the Peranakan Exhibition.

== Personnel ==
Current members

- Hazrul Nizam – tenor vocals (2001–2017, 2018–present)
- John Lee – baritone/tenor vocals, music director, arranger (2005–present)
- Hwang Kai Wen – vocal percussion, tenor vocals (2012–present)
- Genevieve Seah – soprano/alto vocals (2018–present)
- Takuma Tanaka – high tenor vocals (2019–present)
- Michael Liew – bass vocals (2025–present)

Former members

- Angelina Choo – soprano vocals (1997–1998?)
- Tan Lay Hoon – alto vocals (1997–2000)
- James Kenneth Koh – high tenor vocals (1997–2000?)
- Joel Lim – high tenor vocals (1997–1999?)
- Hubie Ordoyo – tenor vocals (1997–1999?)
- Michael Ho – baritone vocals (1997–1998?)
- Horace Hutapea – baritone/bass vocals (1997–2000?)
- Tan Chin Keong – bass vocals (1997–1999?)
- Sam Kan – vocal percussion, tenor vocals (1997–2012)
- Simone Khoo – soprano/alto vocals (1998–2018)
- Rupert Ong – baritone vocals (1998–2004)
- Gerald Tan – high tenor vocals (1999–2018)
- Philip Poh – tenor vocals (1999?–2000?)
- Mike Hung – bass vocals (1999>–2000?)
- Shimona Kee – alto vocals (2000–2003)
- Simon Ong – tenor vocals (2000?–2001)
- Alfred Tan – bass vocals (2000–2005)
- Timothy Huang – bass vocals (2005–2019)
- Sarah-Kei Lauw – soprano vocals (2017–2018)
- Chong Wai Lun – bass vocals (2019–2025)

Substitutes/temporary members

- Amos Ghui – vocal percussion, tenor vocals (substituted for Hwang on certain dates between 2016–2019)
- Owen Li – high tenor vocals (2018; no permanent high tenor yet)
- Bryan Halim – high tenor vocals (2018–2019; no permanent high tenor yet)
- Mervyn Ye – vocal percussion, tenor vocals (substituted for Hwang in 2019)

Other staff

- Andy Quek – music director, arranger (1997–2000)
- Juliette Lai – music director, arranger (2000–2004)

Timeline

== Discography ==
Release date	Title	Note
1997	Aka A Cappella 2	3 tracks in compilation, released in conjunction with concert.
1998	Aka A Cappella 3	2 tracks in compilation, released in conjunction with concert.
2000	Aka A Cappella 4	2 tracks in compilation, released in conjunction with concert.
2001	Mistletoe – An A Cappella Christmas Collection	2 tracks in compilation. Joyful, Joyful & Joy to the World Medley nominated for Best Holiday Song in the 2002 Contemporary A Cappella Recording Awards.
2003	All Wrapped Up	–
2008	Notes From An Island	–
2012	'Tis The Season	–
