= Bevlyn Khoo =

- 邱意淋
- Born: 22 February 1979; Singapore
- Education: National University of Singapore
- Occupations: Singer-songwriter, musician
- Years active: 1999–present
- Agents: SingingTechniques & Singchology (Vocal Coach); A Little Dream Live Music (Ex-Director & Singer) Storyteller Wave Productions (Singer-songwriter/Producer)
- Musical career
- Genre: Jazz Pop
- Instruments: Vocals, piano
- Labels: Independent; S2S (former)

Chinese name
- Chinese: 邱意淋
Transcriptions
Standard Mandarin
- Hanyu Pinyin: Qiū Yìlín
- Website: bevlynkhoo.com

Bevlyn Khoo (Chinese: 邱意淋; pinyin: qiū yì lín; is a jazz pop singer songwriter based in Singapore. Her ability to sing in 5 languages has generated international interest and acclaim for each of her 5 albums. Despite her commercial success, she is credited with being a pioneer within the Singaporean DIY and independent musician community, having founded two music-based companies in addition to her own artistic pursuits since 2002. After parting ways with Japanese record label S2S in 2011, Bevlyn returned to her independent status focused efforts on The Storyteller Wave, the music production and consultancy company she founded in 2013.

She currently teaches pop vocals to private students and at various music colleges.

== Early life and education ==
Khoo was born in Singapore and was educated at River Valley High School, Singapore and Hwa Chong Junior College. She started singing part-time in 1999 at Singapore's Ark Cafe with Dennis Chew and Kelvin Tan while she was a student at the National University of Singapore.

== Singing career ==
Khoo signed as a part-time singer with the A Cappella Society of Singapore until 2006, during which she sang in two A Cappella groups.

In 2003, Khoo joined Singapore's national Mandarin-Pop Songwriting competition Xinyaojie 新谣节. Her song entry "Intersection" 交叉路口 made it to the finals but did not win. The song was later sold to Taiwanese singer Freya Lim, who released it on the soundtrack to Taiwanese TV drama Tricks of the Trade 偷天换日 in 2005.

Khoo also recorded demos for regional songwriters.

Khoo also recorded the theme songs to two Mediacorp TV series: "Cinderella " 灰姑娘 for An Enchanted Life 钻石情缘 in 2006 and "Keep Warm" (保温) for Little Nynoya in 2008. In February 2015, two of her songs from her album The People I've Known 我认识过的人, 别太寂寞 and 灵魂伙伴 were licensed for the opening and closing theme songs of Mediacorp Channel U's serial drama Let It Go 分手快乐.

Khoo performed publicly for the first time as an independent artist in August 2008 at the NUS UCC Theater Hall for the launch of her EP Lonely Afternoon.

Khoo signed a three-album contract with the Japanese independent record label S2S from November 2008 to 2011 which she released the albums, You Are My Angel, Bistro Affair and Feel About You. In an interview with The Straits Times, Khoo cited creative differences as the reason for the separation, saying "I didn't want to end up with people thinking I sing a lot of covers and that's it. After all, I started out as an indie singer who writes original songs." In the same interview, Khoo states that she wanted to "prove she was capable of more than just sad love songs."

In 2009, Khoo performed at the Asia-Pacific Economic Cooperation meeting held in Singapore.

In March 2012, Khoo represented Singapore in Hong Kong Asian Pop Music Festival.

Khoo's songs 跳 and 天天是好天 were used for StarHub's first local serial drama Jump Class 跳班 for its opening and closing theme songs respectively. She also wrote and produced all the songs in episode 6, in which most of the lead actors sang for their characters.

Khoo was also a featured performing artist at the Spring Wave Singapore 《春浪新加坡》in May 2013.

In August 2014, Khoo was also invited to represent Singapore in "The Harmony of Chimes" in Bangkok, a concert put up by the Bangkok Symphony Orchestra for the Asean Economic Community.

== Business career ==
In 2002, Khoo and friends founded A Little Dream, an agency responsible for booking musical artists at events like weddings. The agency consisted of 50 performers.

In 2013, Khoo set up a music production company, The Storyteller Wave, providing music production services for television, music albums and wedding songs. As part of the company, Khoo was the music producer for serial drama Jump Class 跳班.

== Albums ==
=== Lonely Afternoon (EP) ===
Bevlyn's first record as a solo artist was Lonely Afternoon, an EP consisting of 5 originals and one gypsy jazz cover of Edith Piaf's "La Vie en Rose" that was released in February 2008. The EP's diverse genres and languages led World Music Magazine to praise Bevlyn's versatility as a musician. Title track "Lonely Afternoon" showcased Bevlyn's ability to transition between singing in multiple languages within one song, as she sings the verses in Mandarin and choruses in English. Moshin Magazine reviewed a live performance of the song, saying "Articulating the verses with fluent Mandarin, Bevlyn easily transitioned into perfectly enunciated English. Her voice constantly stirred emotion, dripping with a honey-like quality and filling the Rainbow Canopy with a powerful resonance."

The EP was a hit with fans and critics, winning the Best Independent Album at the 2009 Singapore Entertainment Awards. Motivated by Lonely Afternoon's success, Khoo submitted the EP to Japanese record label S2S. Though initially rejected by the label, Khoo was signed to S2S in 2008 after label founder, the late Ken Suzuki, heard the album.

=== You Are My Angel (LP) ===
You Are My Angel is a 10 track LP and the first record Khoo released under S2S on 11 April 2009 in Singapore and in Japan on 12 August 2009. It is significant also for being the first time S2S, a Japanese record label, ventured into Chinese music as 6 of the songs on the album were covers of classic Chinese songs. Several well established producers, arrangers, and session artists played a part in the album's creation, including producers Goh Kheng Long and Kenn C, and arranger/ guitar players Roger Wang of 2VIG and Jamie Wilson. GogoYoko says of You Are My Angel, "The most interesting thing about this album is the charm and spirit that Bevlyn manages to inject into long-standing and endlessly covered songs. She makes them entirely her own." Specifically regarding her voice, Gogoyoko says "(Bevlyn's) seductive, sensuous voice smoothly graces the jazz harmonies."

=== Bistro Affair (LP) ===
Bevlyn's second album release under S2S, 2010s Bistro Affair (released under the title Weekend Journey in Japan on 16 March 2011) is a 14 track LP composed entirely of French songs. Khoo learned French for 5 years before making the record, and her efforts paid off as Bistro Affair charted at the top of popular music charts in Malaysia, Hong Kong, and Taiwan. This feat aside, Bistro Affair is also the only album ever recorded by a Singaporean singing French.

=== Feel About You (LP) ===
The final album Bevyln Khoo released while signed to S2S was 2011's Feel About You. This record is unique in the sense that it featured a mix of original songs (8) and covers (6) of well known Mandarin songs like Singapore's award-winning lyricist Xiaohan's (小寒) "Together Forever"《我们要一直这么要好》and Western songs like Frankie Valli's "My Eyes Adored You" and Duran Duran's "Ordinary World". The album also features "Keep Warm" 《保温》, the sub-theme song Bevlyn recorded for Media Corp's popular television series Little Nyonya《小娘惹》prior to her signing with S2S.

Power of Pop noted that "Songs like 'A Love Song', 'The Goodbye Waltz', 'Feel About You', 'Call It A Day' and 'Barbie Song' all prove that there's more to Bevlyn than a pretty face and silky voice." The review goes on to highlight tracks "Call It A Day" and "The Goodbye Waltz" for their "strong melodies and dynamic arrangements."

=== The People I've Known 《我认识过的人》(LP) ===
Khoo re-emerged on the independent scene with 2013's concept album, The People I've Known 《我认识过的人》. Without S2S funding the album's production, Khoo turned to Pledge Music for help generating the resources necessary to produce the record, ultimately raising $5k USD from fans (15% of the money received after the $5k goal was reached went to the charity Food From the Heart) and further funding the project with $20k SGD of her own money.

In an interview with Music Weekly, Bevlyn explained the album's concept: "I realised that the majority of my songs are usually inspired by the people I know in my life, as opposed to 'fiction-writing'. The songs were inspired by my friends who practically grew up together with me ("Touch of an Angel"), songwriting friends ("The Letter That Never Came"《来信》), ex-relationships, crushes, and... my husband ("Soulmate" 《灵魂伙伴》)!”

The People I've Known received generally positive reviews from several critics. Today Online's Christopher Toh gave the record a 3.5 / 5 rating, and said "(Khoo's) emotive vocal delivery works wonderfully on ballads such as The Letter That Never Came." Power of Pop observed that Khoo was back in her element as an indie songwriter, and said "(The People I've Known) demonstrates Bevlyn's astute understanding of the soft rock dynamics of the Seventies (which forms the core of Mando-pop). Crucially, Bevlyn is much more than a pretty face and pleasing voice – she is a serious songwriter in her own right!" Title track "The People I've Known" was nominated for Best Local Lyrics at the 2013 Singapore Hits Awards (新加坡金曲奖).

At the time The People I've Known was recorded, Khoo considered it her final album according to an interview with Today Online. However, she also conceded that she will miss the challenge, saying "But I know that I will miss the whole thing: Producing, recording, sharing of my originals, the whole indie marketing thing, and the feeling of going against all odds as an indie artist".

=== Beautiful Purpose (Single) ===
Bevlyn wrote and performed the 2013 Miss World Singapore theme song, "Beautiful Purpose."

== Discography ==
Release date	Title	Format	Label
7 February 2008	Lonely Afternoon	EP	Independent
11 April 2009	You Are My Angel	LP	S2S
August 2010	Bistro Affair	LP	S2S
29 July 2011	Feel About You	LP	S2S
16 April 2013	The People I've Known	LP	Independent
26 July 2013	Beautiful Purpose	Single	Independent
12 December 2014	Piano Spa 7	LP	Warner Music Singapore
1 March 2021	The Piccadilly Waltz	LP	Songtrust

== Filmography ==
Television
Year	Programme Name	Role	Notes	Ref
2014	Songs of Who We Are 我的歌声里	As herself	Episode 8	
2015	Jump Class 跳班			

== Awards ==
Year	Ceremony	Award	Nominated work	Result	Ref
2009	Singapore Entertainment Awards	Best Independent Album	Lonely Afternoon EP	Won	
2013	Singapore Hits	Best Local Lyrics	The People I've Known	Nominated	
2013	Yahoo! Singapore	Yahoo! Singapore 9 – Entertainment	Bevlyn Khoo	Nominated	
