= The Journey: A Voyage =

Singaporean TV series

- 信约：唐山到南洋
- Genre: Period drama
- Written by: Ang Eng Tee 洪荣狄
- Directed by: Chong Liung Man 张龙敏; Png Keh Hock 方傢福; Chen Yi You 陈忆幼; Gao Shu Yi 高淑仪
- Starring: Li Nanxing; Elvin Ng; Desmond Tan; Jeanette Aw; Joanne Peh; Tong Bing Yu; Pierre Png
- Opening theme: 家乡 by Alfred Sim
- Ending theme: 月光光 by Low Hui Qi
- Country of origin: Singapore
- Original language: Chinese (with partial Hakka)
- No. of episodes: 31 (Singapore) / 32 (Overseas) (list of episodes)

Production
- Executive producer: Chia Mien Yang 谢敏洋
- Producer: Kok Len Shoong 郭令送
- Running time: approx. 45 minutes (exc. advertisements)

Original release
- Network: MediaCorp Channel 8
- Release: 25 November 2013 – 7 January 2014

Related
- The Journey: Tumultuous Times (2014); The Journey: Our Homeland (2015)

The Journey: A Voyage
- Traditional Chinese: 信约：唐山到南洋
- Simplified Chinese: 信约：唐山到南洋
Transcriptions
Standard Mandarin
- Hanyu Pinyin: xīn yúe : tāng shān dáo nān yáng

The Journey: A Voyage (Chinese: 信约：唐山到南洋; lit. 'A Journey: Tangshan to Nanyang', 'also known as A Voyage') was the first season of MediaCorp Channel 8's nation-building trilogy, The Journey. The season is based on first-generation Chinese immigrants who set foot on the island of Singapore to seek their fortunes and future.

It premiered on 25 November 2013 and concluded on 7 January 2014. A total of 31 episodes aired during the period. It stars first generation casts, Li Nanxing, Elvin Ng, Desmond Tan, Jeanette Aw, Joanne Peh, Tong Bing Yu and Pierre Png as the cast of the first installment of the series.

== Plot ==
Facing poverty, Chinese Hakka immigrants from Yongding, Fujian leave in droves to south-east Asia.

The boat finally arrives in Nanyang. For no apparent reason, Hong Shi is framed for a robbery-murder case and remanded in prison. Out of desperation, Yazi seeks help with a Nyonya, Zhang Huiniang and her “elder brother” Zhang Dong’en as they work hand in hand to prove Hong Shi's innocence. Dong’en is Zhang Guangda's nephew. His father, Zhang Guangping married a Peranakan, Huang Zhenniang years after his wife died. When Zhenniang married into the Zhang family, she brought along her god-daughter Huiniang, who being younger than Dong’en, addresses him as “elder brother”. The two of them were initially at loggerheads, but gradually grew closer. However, being “siblings” prevent them from overstepping the boundary. Dong'en's aunt, Han Xiuxiang is jealous.

Hong Shi returns to work as a tin miner after his release, while Yazi, like the other Hakka women, becomes a “dulang woman”, panning tin for a pittance. The mine owner not only plants opium at the mine area for profits, he also exploits his miners by enticing them into sex, gambling and opium-smoking to recuperate the wages he pays out to them. To help his relative repay gambling debts, Hong Shi is also lured into gambling and eventually incurs a huge debt of $600. At the same time, Supervisor Heilong lusts after Yazi's beauty and attempts to possess her by destroying Hong Shi.

Tianying meets Huiniang and is mesmerised by her. Believing that he is an honest and simple man, Huiniang recommends a job to him in a medicinal herbal store, where he develops a master-disciple relationship with the elderly herbalist, Chen Kuang. The old master imparts prescriptions from his lifelong research to Tianying, exhorting him to produce affordable medicines to benefit the toiling masses. Tianpeng assists Tianying in establishing the business of manufacturing medicinal products which he markets tirelessly until they become a household name. The brothers never forget to donate money to charity and uplift the standard of life in their hometown.

Hong Shi becomes a fugitive after being framed by Heilong. He abandons himself to despair and is reduced to being a beggar living in the mistaken belief that Yazi has deserted him for Heilong...

Zhenniang helms the company when Zhang Guangping dies suddenly, while Zhang Guangda is indignant and schemes to take over it. Zhenniang grooms Dong’en painstakingly, sending Huiniang and him out to the School of Hard Knocks. Going through weal and woe together can only strengthen their relationship, and Dong’en realizes that his feelings for Huiniang have grown to be more than that for a “sister”...

Dong’en and Tianpeng lead an expedition into the deep forest in search of tin mines, and unexpectedly discover the legendary “Lost Granary of Tin Nuggets”, which purportedly makes one rich overnight. Dong’en returns home “in triumph”. He grows to be more mature by day and Zhenniang is pleased that he is competent to succeed in the family business. Zhang Guangda continues to plan on seizing the map to the tin mine from his nephew. Dong’en accepts an arranged marriage and prepares to visit his ancestral village to tie the knot, Huiniang is dejected. While Zhenniang accompanies Dong’en to the village to meet his prospective wife, Zhang Guangda finds his chance to harm them... With the family business already in his hands, Zhang Guangda spares no time to harm Dong’en.

Suffering from mercury poisoning, Dong’en waits in agony for an opportunity to retaliate. He vows to regain his parents’ hard-earned business and to secure a life partner for Huiniang...

== Cast ==
=== Main ===
- Li Nanxing as Zhang Tianpeng 张天鹏
- Elvin Ng as Zhang Dong'en 张东恩
- Desmond Tan as Hong Shi 洪石
- Jeanette Aw as Lin Yazi 林鸭子
- Joanne Peh as Zhang Huiniang 张蕙娘
  - Chloe Ng played the younger version of Zhang
- Chris Tong as Bai Mingzhu 白明珠
- Pierre Png as Heilong (Wang Feilong) 黑龙 (王飞龙)
- Terence Cao as Zhang Guangda 张广达
- Carole Lin as Huang Zhenniang 黄珍娘. Huang Biren was slated to star as Huang Zhenniang but she had to turn down the role weeks before filming commenced due to a 10 cm cyst which had grown in her kidney.
- Priscelia Chan as Han Xiuxiang 韩秀香
- Allen Chen as Zhang Tianying 张天鹰
- Zhu Xiufeng 朱秀凤 as Old Madam Zhang 张母
- Desmond Shen as Zhang Guangping 张广平

=== Others ===
- Wayne Chua as Cuiying 翠英
- Li Wenhai as Chen Kuang 陈匡
- Louis Wu as Charlie Zhang 查理章
- Chua Cheng Pou as Ah Song 阿松
- David Leong as Zhu Fangpi 朱放屁

== Production ==
The series is Channel 8's 2013 year-end blockbuster celebrating 50 years of television. It was also partly sponsored by the Media Development Authority of Singapore.

This is the first period drama to use special effects (CGI) as some of the objects used in the 1920s are not readily available in the present. Some scenes in the series are also filmed in Penang, Ipoh and Yongding District, China.

Originally, the first season was planned to have 30 episodes. An additional episode was added for a total of 31 episodes.

== Soundtrack ==
Song title	Performer	Type of Song
家鄉	Alfred Sim	Theme Song
月光光	Low Hui Qi 刘慧琪	Sub Theme Song

== Release ==
The show aired at 9pm on weekdays and had a repeat telecast at 8am the following day.

== Reception ==
The series is one of three drama serials to tie-in for 3rd-highest-rated drama serial in 2013 (with It's a Wonderful Life and Break Free), with an average viewership of 835,000, behind C.L.I.F. 2 (with 901,000) and The Dream Makers (with 885,000).

The Journey culminates in Singapore's nation building celebrations in 2015. Two more seasons - Tumultuous Times and Our Homeland - were launched in 2014 and 2015 respectively.

=== Accolades ===
A Voyage garnered 12 nominations for 10 awards in the Star Awards, behind The Dream Makers. It won two of them, the Best Director and Best Actor awards.

Year	Award	Category	Nominees	Result	Ref
2014	Star Awards	Young Talent Award	Chloe Ng Ying En	Nominated	
2014	Star Awards	Young Talent Award	Ivan Lo	Nominated	
2014	Star Awards	Best Theme Song	《家乡》 by Alfred Sim	Nominated	
2014	Star Awards	Best Director	Chong Liung Man	Won	
2014	Star Awards	Best Screenplay	Ang Eng Tee	Nominated	
2014	Star Awards	Favourite Male Character	Desmond Tan	Nominated	
2014	Star Awards	Favourite Female Character	Joanne Peh	Nominated	
2014	Star Awards	Rocket Award	Priscelia Chan	Won	
2014	Star Awards	Best Actor	Pierre Png	Won	
2014	Star Awards	Best Actor	Terence Cao	Nominated	
2014	Star Awards	Best Actress	Chris Tong	Nominated	
2014	Star Awards	Best Supporting Actress	Priscelia Chan	Nominated	
2014	Star Awards	Top Rated Drama Serial 2013	—N/a	Nominated	
2014	Star Awards	Best Drama Serial	—N/a	Nominated	

== Other media ==
This series was adapted as a comic and has been selling at Popular Bookstores since November 2015, targeting at upper primary and secondary students. The comic showcases the best of the series, and is promoted by the Committee to Promote Chinese Language.
