= Anderson Secondary School =

- 安德逊中学; Sekolah Menengah Anderson

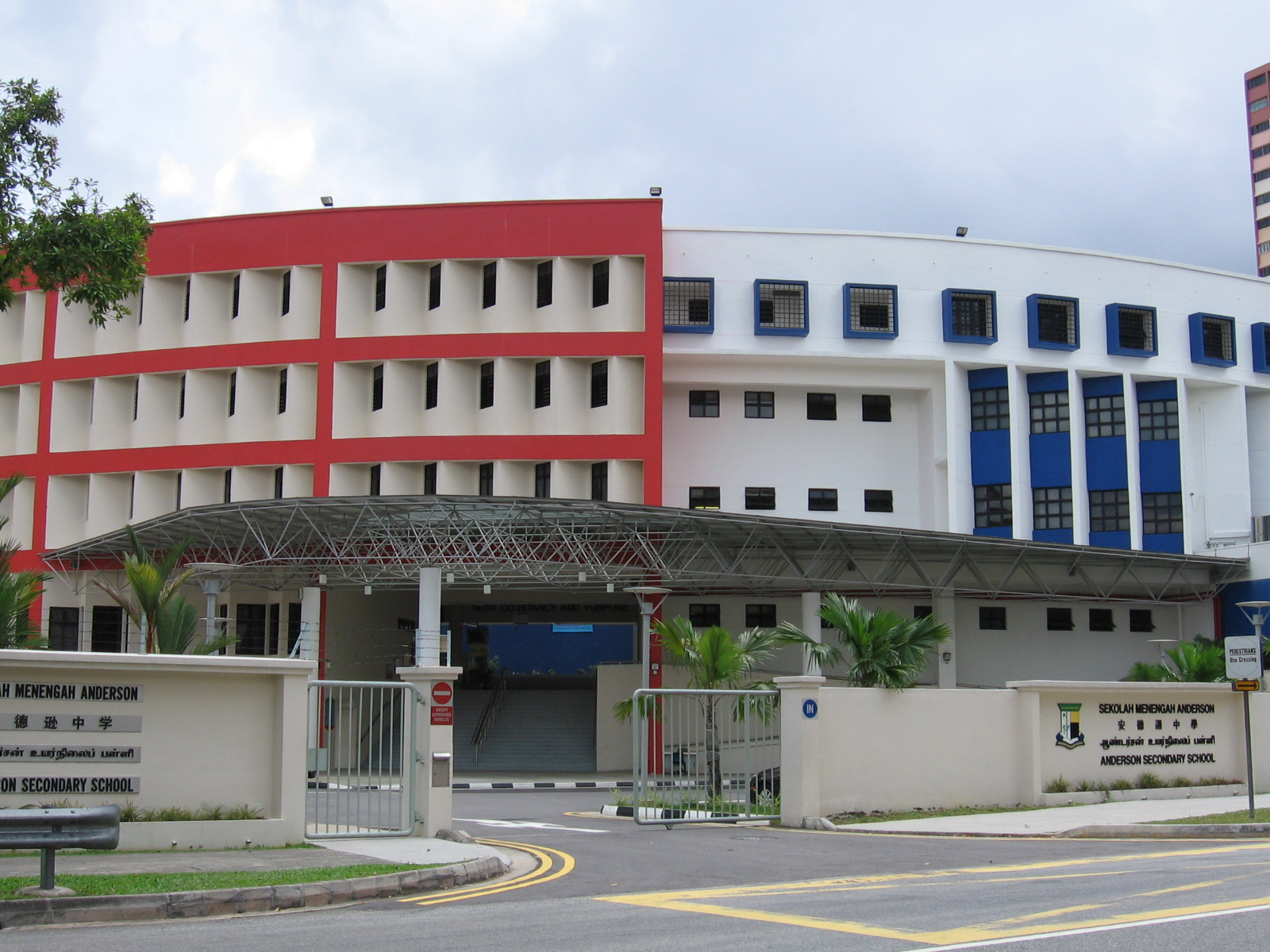

Location
- 10, Ang Mo Kio Street 53, Singapore 569206; Ang Mo Kio, Singapore; 1°22′29.4″N 103°51′5.1″E

Information
- Type: Autonomous; Government
- Motto: With Constancy and Purpose
- Established: 1960; 66 years ago
- Session: Single session (morning)
- School code: 3001
- Principal: Tan Po Chin
- Gender: Co-educational
- Enrolment: Approx. 1,200
- Color: Yellow Green Blue
- Website: http://www.andersonsec.moe.edu.sg

Anderson Secondary School (ANDSS) is a co-educational government autonomous school in Ang Mo Kio, Singapore offering education for Secondary 1 to Secondary 5. It became an autonomous school in 1994 and was one of the pioneer autonomous schools in Singapore.

== History ==
Anderson Secondary School was founded in 1960 as a girls' primary school. In 1964, it became a girls' secondary school and began admitting boys in 1965. The school has occupied several sites. Previously situated at Stevens Road and Anderson Road (from which it got its name), the school moved to Ang Mo Kio Street 44 in 1984. In December 1993, it moved to its current site, Ang Mo Kio Street 53.

Anderson Secondary School has been used from time to time for educational experiments. In 1994 it was declared an autonomous school for consistent academic performance, and in 1996 it was one of the first schools to use the Students-and-Teachers Workbench project. In 1997 it was chosen as an IT demo school. The school received the School Distinction Award from the Ministry of Education in 2004.

=== Programme for Rebuilding and Improving Existing Schools ===
From 2003 to 2006, the school underwent a Programme for Rebuilding and Improving Existing Schools upgrading project. The school raised funds for a student activity hub, a heritage centre and a multi-purpose studio, upgraded the lecture theatre and classrooms and added a five-storey building.

The final stage of the upgrading process took place in 2005. Some facilities, such as the school hall, cookery rooms and the football field, were ready in July 2006.

A facility called the "Inspire Town" was opened in 2005. This is a room where innovation and creativity is encouraged amongst pupils. Two classrooms were converted into a black box theater for use by drama students.

In 2008, an indoor sports hall was opened.

=== Uniform and attire ===
Girls wear a white blouse and a kelly blue tunic knee-length pinafore. Lower secondary boys wear a pair of short trousers while upper secondary boys wear a pair of white long trousers. Students wear the school badge, with their name tag directly below it. Students wear the school tie on Mondays, and at formal school functions. On Fridays, students are allowed to wear "half-uniform" (PE T-shirt or class T-shirt with uniform bottom). From time to time, if there is an increase in temperature, the school may allow "half-uniform" from Tuesdays to Thursdays.

=== Discipline ===
The Anderson Secondary School Discipline Committee has classified offences committed by students into minor and major offences. Minor offences include being late for school, flaws in personal grooming and use of electronic devices during curriculum time. Major offences include absenteeism, forgery, arson and many others. Punishments for major offences include detention, caning (for boys only) and suspension.

== Academic information ==
Being an integrated secondary school, Anderson Secondary School offers three academic streams, namely the four-year Express course, as well as the Normal Course, comprising Normal (Academic) and Normal (Technical) academic tracks.

=== O Level Express Course ===
The Express Course is a nationwide four-year programme that leads up to the Singapore-Cambridge GCE Ordinary Level examination.

=== Normal Course ===
The Normal Course is a nationwide 4-year programme leading to the Singapore-Cambridge GCE Normal Level examination, which runs either the Normal (Academic) curriculum or Normal (Technical) curriculum, abbreviated as N(A) and N(T) respectively.

==== Normal (Academic) Course ====
In the Normal (Academic) course, students are offered 5-8 subjects in the Singapore-Cambridge GCE Normal (Academic) Level examination. Compulsory subjects include:

- English Language
- Mother Tongue Language
- Elementary Mathematics
- Combined Science (Chemistry & Physics)
- Combined Humanities (Social Studies & History/Geography)
- Design & Technology/Principles of Accounts/Art

A 5th year leading to the Singapore-Cambridge GCE Ordinary Level examination is available to N(A) students who perform well in their Singapore-Cambridge GCE Normal Level examination. Students can move from one course to another based on their performance and the assessment of the school principal and teachers.

==== Normal (Technical) Course ====
The Normal (Technical) course prepares students for a technical-vocational education at the Institute of Technical Education. Students will offer 5-7 subjects in the Singapore-Cambridge GCE Normal (technical) Level examination. The curriculum is tailored towards strengthening students’ proficiency in English and Mathematics. Students take English Language, Mathematics, Basic Mother Tongue and Computer Applications as compulsory subjects.

=== Overseas exchange programmes ===
Overseas exchange programmes are known as Cultural Flexibility Programme:

- Anderson-Winitsuksa STEP Camp, Cultural Exchange & Adventure Camp
- Anderson-Marryatville Drama Educational Exchange
- Anderson-Kagoshima Daiichi High School Sports Exchange
- Anderson-EMAS Overseas Learning Journey, Sabah, Language Immersion & Cultural Exchange
- Anderson-SM Sultan Abdul Halim School Language Immersion & Cultural Exchange

Anderson Secondary School was the partner school for South Korea during the inaugural Youth Olympic Games in Singapore.

== Co-curricular activities ==
Uniformed Groups

- National Cadet Corps (Land, boys)
- National Police Cadet Corps (Land)
- Anderson Girl Guides (girls)

Performing Arts

- Anderson Theatre Circle
- Anderson Military Band
- Chinese Dance (Girls)
- Malay Dance
- Choir

Sports

- Basketball
- Netball (Girls)
- Table Tennis (Girls)
- Volleyball (Girls)
- Wushu
- Soccer(Boys)

Clubs and Societies

- Infocomm Club
- Robotics Club (Formerly known as Cybernetics)
- Green Club
- Art Club
- Sports and Recreation Club
- Anderson Science Academy

Student Leadership

- Student Council
- HCE Ambassadors
- Peer Support Leader

== School events ==
=== Intra-school events ===
The school organises events such as Cross Country (Term 1) and Arts Fest (before end of Term 4) every year.

The school's Choir and Military Band stages a performance biennially known as VOICES and AMBience respectively, with the Chinese Dance and Malay Dance team staging a joint performance biennially known as ANDance, with their last concerts in 2014, it has been stopped indefinitely with the current school principal's decision.

Most intra-school events are played at the class level, where students compete in events for their classes. This is done instead of inter-house competition to encourage greater bonding within classes.

== Principals ==
- 1964 M.A. Mallal
- 1965-1973 Heng Cher Siang
- 1974-1976 Peggy Phang
- 1976-1978 Lim Soon Tze
- 1979-1980 Betty Lim Hsiu Yun
- 1981-1983 Sarwan Singh
- 1984-1992 Leong Yop Pooi
- 1993-1996 Kwek Hiok Chuang
- 1997-2001 Chan-Low Khah Gek
- 2002-2005 Tan-Soh Wai Lan
- Dec 2005-2010 Poh-Tham Mun See
- Dec 2010-2015 Mark Lo Khee Tian
- Dec 2015-2021 Tan-Thong May Teng
- Dec 2021-2026 Tan Po Chin
- Dec 2026- Timothy Tay Soon Inn

== Notable alumni ==
- Colin Cheong: writer and journalist
- Louis Chua Kheng Wee: Singaporean politician
- Adrin Loi: Chairman and CEO, Ya Kun Kaya Toast
- William Scorpion: Mandopop singer
- Ang Peng Siong: Olympian (swimming)
- Cruz Teng: Former Programme director & Head of 933FM

== See also ==
- Education in Singapore
