= Singapore Day =

Singapore Day is an event organised by the Overseas Singaporean Unit under the Ministry of Culture, Community and Youth (Singapore) to engage Overseas Singaporeans and their families. Held in cities with a significant community of Overseas Singaporeans, it is a single-day annual event designed to give Singaporeans a "slice of home while overseas" through food, performances, information updates on the situation in Singapore and career options to entice them to return to the country. Political leaders would often make unannounced visits, such as Prime Minister Lee Hsien Loong's visit to the London event in 2014.

As of 2015, Singapore Day has been held eight times in five cities, starting with New York City in 2007. While the event has seen generally good turn-outs of between 5,000 and 8,000 with positive reviews amongst visitors, its multi-million price-tag to stage each event has come under scrutiny in Singapore where the costs involved were questioned in parliament. A controversy over admission to the 2013 event in Sydney also erupted when a local Australian accused the event of being "racist" and "outrageous", despite the event being a ticketed event and the man was turned away as he held no ticket.

== Programmes ==
Singaporean cuisine comprising local hawker fare is prepared and served at the event by Singaporean hawkers.

Singaporean artistes and performers who have participated in Singapore Day include MediaCorp artistes, local comedians Hossan Leong and Jack Neo, singers Kit Chan and Rui En, rapper Sheikh Haikel, indie-rock band Cashew Chemists, musical cabaret group Dim Sum Dollies, blogger mrbrown, actor Gurmit Singh and acoustic and percussion bands like The Great Spy Experiment, Jack and Rai and Bloco Singapura.

Recruitment booths and showcase displays set up on the event grounds allow Singaporeans abroad to keep abreast with the latest developments and career opportunities back in Singapore.

== Years ==
| Year | Date | Venue |
|---|---|---|
| 2007 | April 21 | Wollman Rink, Central Park, New York City, United States |
| 2008 | October 4 | Sidney Myer Music Bowl, Melbourne, Australia |
| 2009 | April 29 | Hampton Court Palace, London, United Kingdom |
| 2011 | April 16 | Century Park, Shanghai, China |
| 2012 | April 14 | Prospect Park, Brooklyn, New York, United States |
| 2013 | October 12 | Royal Botanic Gardens, Sydney, Australia |
| 2014 | March 29 | Victoria Park, London, United Kingdom |
| 2015 | April 11 | Century Park, Shanghai, China |
| 2016 | September 24 | Pier 70, San Francisco, United States |
| 2017 | September 9 | Flemington Racecourse, Melbourne, Australia |
| 2018 | March 24 | Greenwich Peninsula, London, United Kingdom |
| 2019 | April 13 | Century Park, Shanghai, China |

The first Singapore Day in 2007 was targeted at a community residing in New York City and other neighbouring cities and states such as Washington, D.C., New Jersey and Pennsylvania. It was held on 21 April 2007 and attracted an unexpectedly high response. As a result, the venue was shifted from Bryant Park to the Wollman Rink in Central Park. Deputy Prime Minister Wong Kan Seng was in New York for the event. 6,000 people attended the event and which included New Yorkers.

Singapore Day 2008 was held in Melbourne, on October 4, with a turnout of over 10,000 people.

Singapore Day 2009 was held at the Hampton Court Palace to the south-west of London, on 25 April 2009. Over 12,000 people, from various parts of Europe, turned up for this outdoor event.

Singapore Day 2011 was held at the Century Park in Pudong District, Shanghai, on 16 April 2011. The event had attracted over 5,500 Singaporeans and their families from all over China.

== Controversies ==
=== Allegations of racial discrimination at events ===
A man wrote to a radio talkshow host on 2GB claiming that he and others were turned away from a public area in the Royal Botanic Gardens, Sydney, where the celebration of Singapore day was held in 2013, because they were of Caucasian appearance, whilst people of Asian appearance were allowed in without checking. Material for the event specified that only Singaporeans and their families could attend.

Replying to queries from Yahoo News, the organizers said the event was a pre-registered and ticketed event for crowd control purposes, and that registered Singaporeans were allowed to bring non-Singaporean friends and family members. The acting executive director of the Botanic Gardens responded to questions from the Daily Telegraph by stating that the event had caused community concern and that they would be reviewing whether it is appropriate for the Botanic Gardens to be involved with Singapore Day in the future.
