= List of Darjah Utama Bakti Cemerlang recipients =

This is a list of recipients of the Darjah Utama Bakti Cemerlang, a national honour instituted in 1968. The honour was formerly known as Pingat Bakti Chemerlang from 1963 to 1967.

== Recipients ==
=== Pingat Bakti Cemerlang (1963–1967) ===
List of Pingat Bakti Cemerlang recipients, with the year, and role(s) held
Year	Recipient	Role	Notes
1963	Phay Seng Whatt	Chairman, Public Service Commission	
1964	Puan Noor Aishah	For contributions to social welfare	
1966	Albert Winsemius	Economic adviser to Singapore	
1967	George Bogaars	Permanent secretary, Ministry of the Interior and Defence	
1967	Hon Sui Sen	Chairman, Economic Development Board	

=== Darjah Utama Bakti Cemerlang (1968–present) ===
List of Darjah Utama Bakti Cemerlang recipients, with the year, and role(s) held
Year	Recipient	Role(s)	Notes
1968	Howe Yoon Chong	Permanent secretary, Ministry of National Development; Chairman, Housing and Development Board	
1971	Tan Teck Khim	Commissioner of Police, Singapore Police Force	
1972	Anne, Princess Royal		
1972	Tang I-Fang	Former chairman, Economic Development Board	
1978	Tan Boon Teik	Attorney-general of Singapore	
1978	Pang Tee Pow	Former permanent secretary, Ministry of Defence; Posthumous award	
1982	Tan Teck Chwee	Chairman, Public Service Commission	
1985	Ee Peng Liang	Chairman, Singapore Council of Social Service	
1989	Lee Hee Seng	Chairman, Public Service Commission	
1989	Yong Pung How	Former chairman, Singapore Broadcasting Corporation	
1990	Chiang Hsiao-wu	Former trade representative of Taiwan to Singapore	
1990	Lee Khoon Choy	Special contributions to the Government	
1990	Rahim Ishak	Special contributions to the Government	
1990	Ya'acob Mohamed	Special contributions to the Government; Posthumous award	
1990	Tommy Koh	Ambassador-at-large, Ministry of Foreign Affairs	
1991	Wee Chong Jin	Former Chief Justice of Singapore	
1991	Sim Kee Boon	Chairman, Civil Aviation Authority of Singapore	
1993	Mohammed Hanif Omar	Inspector-general, Royal Malaysia Police	
1995	Ong Swee Law	Executive chairman, Singapore Zoological Gardens; Posthumous award	
1996	Abdul Rahim Mohd Noor	Inspector-general, Royal Malaysia Police	
1999	Ngiam Tong Dow	Chairman, Housing and Development Board; Chairman, Central Provident Fund Board	
1999	Chan Sek Keong	Attorney-general of Singapore	
1999	Ya'akub Zainal	Police commissioner, Royal Brunei Police Force	
2000	Lim Chong Yah	Chairman, National Wages Council	
2000	Lim Pin	Vice-chancellor, National University of Singapore	
2000	Lee Ek Tieng	Group managing director, GIC; Deputy chairman, Monetary Authority of Singapore	
2001	Lee Seng Wee	Chairman, OCBC Bank	
2001	Alan Choe	Former chairman, Sentosa Development Corporation	
2002	Andrew Chew	Chairman, Public Service Commission	
2002	Yeo Ning Hong	Chairman, PSA International	
2003	Norian Mai	Inspector-general, Royal Malaysia Police	
2003	Cham Tao Soon	University Distinguished Professor, Nanyang Technological University	
2006	Al-Muhtadee Billah	Crown Prince of Brunei	
2006	Stephen Lee Ching Yen	Managing director, Great Malaysia Textile Manufacturing Company Pte Ltd	
2006	Eddie Teo	Former high commissioner of Singapore to Australia	
2007	Cheng Wai Keung	Chairman, Neptune Orient Lines	
2007	Lee Seng Gee	Chairman, Lee Foundation	
2007	Lim Chee Onn	Executive chairman, Keppel Ltd.	
2008	Mick Keelty	Commissioner of the Australian Federal Police	
2008	Chao Hick Tin	Judge of Appeal, Supreme Court of Singapore; Special contributions for the Pedra Branca dispute	
2008	Koh Boon Hwee	Chairman, Nanyang Technological University	
2009	Musa Hassan	Inspector-general, Royal Malaysia Police	
2009	Fock Siew Wah	Group chairman, PSA International	
2010	Tan Gee Paw	Chairman, Public Utilities Board	
2010	Bambang Hendarso Danuri	19th Chief of the Indonesian National Police	
2011	Wee Cho Yaw	Pro-chancellor, Nanyang Technological University	
2011	Chan Heng Chee	Ambassador of Singapore to the United States	
2012	Mohd Sidek Hassan	Chief Secretary to the Government of Malaysia	
2012	Peter Seah Lim Huat	Chairman, DBS Bank; Chairman, ST Engineering; Chairman, SingHealth	
2012	Tan Chin Tiong	Ambassador-at-large, Ministry of Foreign Affairs	
2013	Hasrin Sabtu	Police commissioner, Royal Brunei Police Force	
2013	Ismail Omar	Inspector-general, Royal Malaysia Police	
2013	Timur Pradopo	20th Chief of the Indonesian National Police	
2014	Chua Thian Poh	President, Singapore Federation of Chinese Clan Associations; Honorary president, Singapore Chinese Chamber of Commerce and Industry; Chairman, Ren Ci Hospital; Chairman, Business China; Chairman, Chinese Development Assistance Council	
2015	Sidek Saniff	Former adviser to Aljunied Grassroots Organisations	
2015	Ch'ng Jit Koon	Former adviser to Tiong Bahru, Bukit Merah and Tanjong Pagar Grassroots Organisations	
2015	Tan Wee Kiat	Chief executive officer, Gardens by the Bay; Advisor, National Parks Board	
2015	Liu Thai Ker	Chairman, Centre for Liveable Cities Advisory Board	
2015	Tee Tua Ba	Non-resident ambassador of Singapore to Switzerland	
2015	Winston Choo	Non-resident ambassador of Singapore to Israel	
2015	Bahrin Mohd Noor	Police commissioner, Royal Brunei Police Force	
2016	Peter Ho	Chairman, Urban Redevelopment Authority	
2016	Badrodin Haiti	22nd Chief of the Indonesian National Police	
2017	Ho Kwon Ping	Chairman, Singapore Management University	
2017	Chin Siat Yoon	Former ambassador of Singapore to Japan	
2017	Jammy Shah Al-Islam	Police commissioner, Royal Brunei Police Force	
2018	Wong Ngit Liong	Former chairman, National University of Singapore	
2018	Philip Ng Chee Tat	Former chairman, Singapore University of Technology and Design	
2019	Mohamad Fuzi Harun	Inspector-general, Royal Malaysia Police	
2019	Chiang Chie Foo	Chairman, Central Provident Fund Board; Chairman, Public Utilities Board	
2019	Ang Kong Hua	Chairman, Sembcorp; Chairman, GIC	
2019	Gerard Ee	Chairman, Charity Council	
2020	Wang Gungwu	Former chairman, ISEAS – Yusof Ishak Institute; Former chairman, Lee Kuan Yew School of Public Policy; Former chairman, East Asian Institute	
2020	Koh Choon Hui	Chairman, Singapore Children's Society	
2020	Tito Karnavian	29th Minister of Home Affairs of the Republic Of Indonesia	
2021	Richard Magnus	Chairman, Public Transport Council	
2021	Benny Lim Siang Hoe	Chairman, National Parks Board	
2022	Tan Chorh Chuan	Chief health scientist, Ministry of Health; Executive director, MOH Office for Healthcare Transformation	
2022	Lee Tzu Yang	Chairman, Public Service Commission	
2022	Gopinath Pillai	Former chairman, Indian Heritage Centre Advisory Board	
2023	Luhut Binsar Pandjaitan	5th Coordinating Ministry for Maritime and Investments Affairs of Indonesia	
2023	Kwa Chong Seng	Former chairman, ST Engineering	
2023	Kay Kuok Oon Kwong	Former chairman, National Healthcare Group; Chairman, Yale-NUS College	
2023	Timothy de Souza	Member, Founders' Memorial Committee	
2023	Bobby Chin	Former chairman, Housing and Development Board	
2024	Teo Ming Kian	Chairman, ST Engineering; Former director, Temasek Holdings	
2024	Phillip Tan Eng Seong	Chairman, Yellow Ribbon Singapore	
2024	Syed Hassan bin Syed Mohammad bin Salim Al-Attas	Member, Presidential Council for Minority Rights	
2024	Peter Ong	Former chairman, Enterprise Singapore; Former Head of the Singapore Civil Service	
2024	Hsieh Fu Hua	Chairman, National University Health System; Chairman, National University of Singapore	
2024	Jennie Chua	Chairman, Woodlands Hospital Development Board Committee	
2024	Acryl Sani Abdullah Sani	Former inspector-general, Royal Malaysia Police	
2024	Irwan Hambali	Police commissioner, Royal Brunei Police Force	
2025	Lui Pao Chuen	Temasek Defence Professor; Chairman, Singapore Nuclear Research and Safety Institute; Former chairman, Ministry of Finance Development Projects Advisory Panel	
2025	Lim Tze Peng	Artist; Posthumous award	
2025	Razarudin Husain	Inspector-general, Royal Malaysia Police	
2026	Alan Chan	Chairman, Land Transport Authority	
2026	Bob Tan	Former chairman, Sentosa Development Corporation	
2026	Edmund Cheng	Former chairman, Civil Aviation Authority of Singapore	
2026	Iskandar Jalil	Master potter	
2026	Mohamad Hasbi Hassan	Co-founder and co-chairman, Religious Rehabilitation Group	
