= List of Darjah Utama Nila Utama recipients =

This is a list of recipients of the Darjah Utama Nila Utama, the third most prestigious national honour conferred by the President of Singapore.

== Recipients ==
List of Darjah Utama Nila Utama recipients, with the year, grade, and role(s) held
Year	Grade (if any)	Recipient	Role(s)	Notes
1990	First Class	Prince Jefri Bolkiah	Prince of Brunei	
1990	First Class	Toh Chin Chye	Former Deputy Prime Minister of Singapore	
1990	First Class	Ong Pang Boon	Former Minister of Education; Former Minister for Home Affairs	
1990	First Class	E. W. Barker	Former Minister for National Development; Former Minister for Law	
1990	First Class	Michael Fam	Chairman, Mass Rapid Transit Corporation	
1990	Second Class	Yong Nyuk Lin	Former Minister of Health; Former Minister of Education	
1990	Second Class	Jek Yeun Thong	Former Minister for Labour	
1990	Second Class	Othman Wok	Former Minister for Social Affairs; Former Minister for Culture	
1990	Second Class	Chua Sian Chin	Advocate and solicitor	
1991	Second Class	Ee Peng Liang	President, Singapore Council of Social Service	
2006	First Class	Lim Siong Guan	Permanent Secretary, Ministry of Finance	
2006	First Class	Philip Yeo	Chairman, Agency for Science, Technology and Research	
2008	First Class	Tommy Koh	Ambassador-at-Large, Ministry of Foreign Affairs; Special contributions for the Pedra Branca dispute	
2008	Second Class	Andrew Chew	Chairman, Public Service Commission	
2012	First Class	J. Y. Pillay	Chairman, Council of Presidential Advisers	
2015	First Class	Stephen Lee Ching Yen	Immediate Past President, Singapore National Employers Federation	
2017	First Class	Eddie Teo Chan Seng	Chairman, Public Service Commission	
2019	High Distinction	Lim Chee Onn	Member, Council of Presidential Advisers	
2021	Distinction	Peter Seah Lim Huat	Chairman, DBS Bank; Chairman, Laselle College of the Arts; Chairman, National Wages Council; Chairman, Singapore Airlines; Member, Council of Presidential Advisers	
2024	High Distinction	Peter Ho	Chairman, Urban Redevelopment Authority	
2025		Tan Gee Paw	Former chairman, Changi Airport Group	
