= Teck-Hua Ho =

Singaporean economist

- 何德华
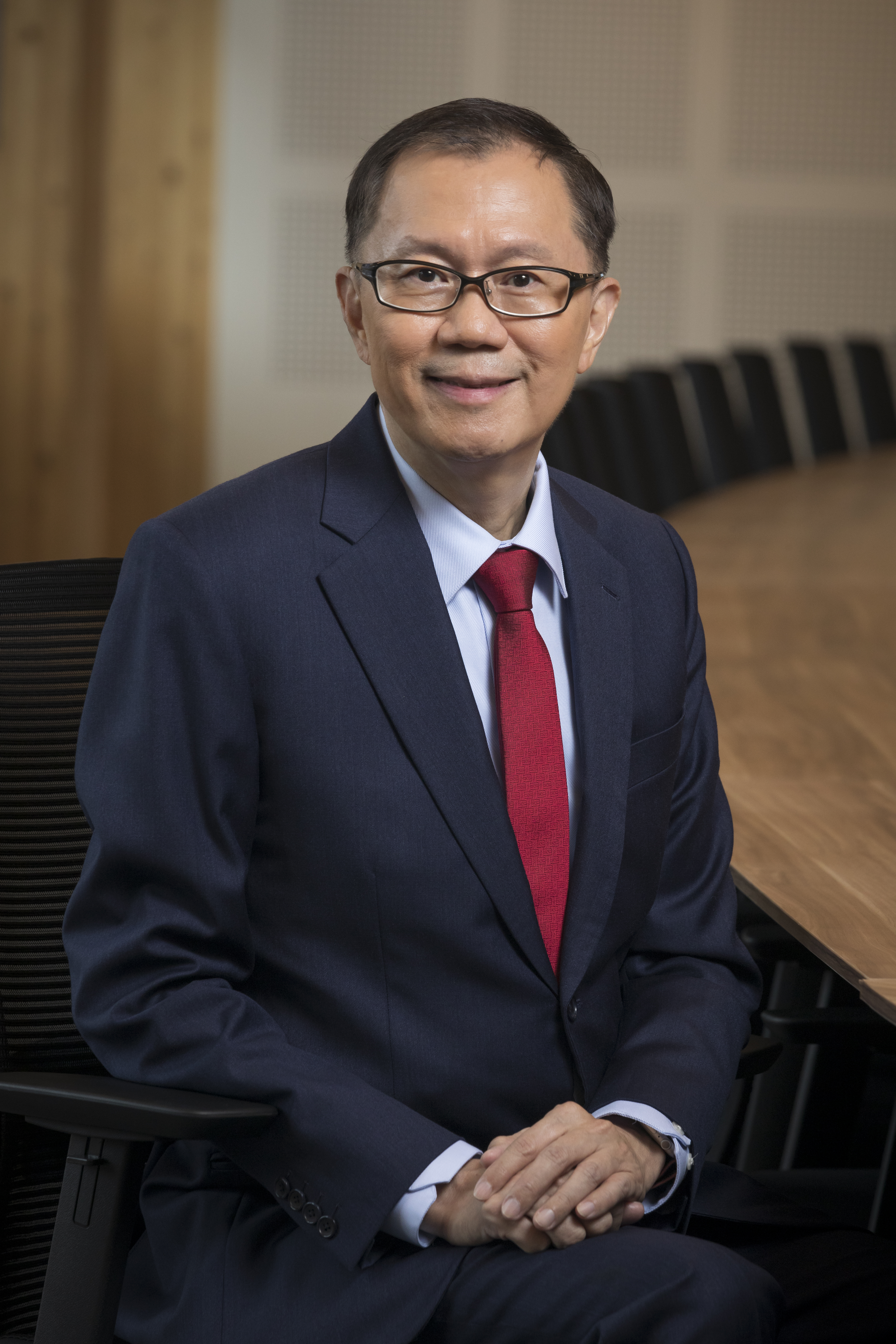
- Ho in 2023

5th President of Nanyang Technological University
- Incumbent
- Assumed office 24 April 2023
- Preceded by: Subra Suresh

Personal details
- Born: 10 May 1961 (age 65) Singapore
- Education: National University of Singapore (BS, MS); University of Pennsylvania (MA, PhD)
- Scientific career
- Workplaces: Nanyang Technological University; National University of Singapore; University of California, Berkeley; University of Pennsylvania; University of California, Los Angeles
- Thesis: Product design strategy analysis: The marketing-manufacturing interface (1993)
- Doctoral advisors: Morris Cohen; Jehoshua Eliashberg

Teck-Hua Ho (Chinese: 何德华; pinyin: Hé Déhuá) is the fifth president of the Nanyang Technological University, Singapore (NTU). He is also a Distinguished University Professor at NTU Singapore, and an NUS University Professor at the National University of Singapore (NUS). Prior to joining NTU, he was the senior deputy president and provost at NUS, and the William Halford Jr. Family Professor of Marketing at the Haas School of Business (University of California, Berkeley). Ho is the founding executive chairman of AI Singapore, a national research and development programme in artificial intelligence created in July 2017. He is also chair of the Association of Pacific Rim Universities and president of the Academy of Engineering, Singapore.

== Education ==
Ho obtained a bachelor's degree with first class honours in electrical engineering in 1985 and a master's degree in computer and information sciences in 1989 from NUS. He then obtained a master's degree in 1991 and a PhD in 1993 in decision sciences from the Wharton School of the University of Pennsylvania.

Ho's research interests include behavioral game theory and alternatives to equilibrium models, behavioral change in the field, and data-driven decision sciences.

== Career ==
From 1997 to 2002, Ho was associate professor of marketing at the Wharton School. Prior to his time at the Wharton School, he was assistant professor of operations and technology management at the UCLA Anderson School of Management.

From 2002 to 2015, Ho was a professor at the Haas School of Business. At the School, he was the William Halford Jr. Family Chair in Marketing and director of the Asia Business Center. He was also associate dean of academic affairs (2004-2006) and chair of the marketing group (2004-2006 and 2008-2011).

Ho served as the editor-in-chief of Management Science from 1 July 2014 to 31 December 2017.

Ho was senior deputy president and provost (2018-2023), deputy president of research and technology (2015-2017) and vice president of research strategy (2011-2012) at NUS. He was also a professor of economics and marketing at the NUS Business School and director of the NUS Centre for Behavioural Economics.

In 2023, Ho was appointed as the fifth president of NTU.

Ho also sits on the boards of the Communicable Diseases Agency, DSO National Laboratories, the Government Technology Agency, the Monetary Authority of Singapore, and the National Research Foundation.

== Awards ==
At the Haas School of Business, Ho won the Berkeley Distinguished Teaching Award in 2010 and the Earl F. Cheit Award for Excellence in Teaching, in 2004, 2005, and 2006. In 2015, Ho won the Williamson Award. This is Haas School’s highest faculty award and celebrates honorees who best reflect the character and integrity associated with the scholarly work and legacy of UC Berkeley faculty member Oliver E. Williamson, the 2009 Nobel Laureate in Economic Sciences.

Ho was elected an academician of Academia Sinica in 2022, a fellow of the Institute for Operations Research and the Management Sciences (INFORMS) in 2024, and a fellow of the Singapore National Academy of Science in 2026.

Ho was awarded the Pingat Pentadbiran Awam (Public Administration Medal) - Gold in 2023 and the President's Science and Technology Medal in 2024. The latter is Singapore’s top honour and is awarded to people who have made “distinguished, sustained and exceptional contributions" in advancing science and technology ecosystems in the country.

In 2025, Asian Scientist listed him on the Asian Scientist 100.

== Selected papers ==
1. Camerer, C. and Ho, T-H., “Experience-weighted Attraction Learning in Normal Form Games”, Econometrica 67(4): 827-874, 1999.
2. Camerer, C., Ho, T-H. and Chong J-K., “A Cognitive Hierarchy Model of Games”, Quarterly Journal of Economics 119(3): 861-898, 2004.
3. Camerer, C., Dreber, A., Forsell, E., Ho, T-H., Huber, J., Johannesson, M., Kirchler, M., Almenberg, J., Altmejd, A., Chan, T., Heikensten, E., Holzmeister, F., Imai, T., Isaksson, S., Nave, G., Pfeiffer, T., Razen, M., Wu, H. “Evaluating replicability of laboratory experiments in Economics”, Science 351(6280): 1433–1436, 2016.
4. Camerer C., Dreber A., Holzmeister F., Ho T-H., Huber J., Johannesson M., Kirchler M., Nave G., Nosek B., Pfeiffer T., Altmejd A., Buttrick N., Chan T., Chen Y., Forsell E., Gampa A., Heikensten E., Hummer L., Imai T., Isaksson S., Manfredi D., Rose J., Wagenmakers E-J., Wu H., “Evaluating the Replicability of Social Science Experiments in Science & Nature between 2010 and 2015”, Nature Human Behaviour 2: 627-644, 2018.
