= Cham Tao Soon =

Singaporean academic and engineer

Cham Tao Soon DUBC (born 1939) is a Singaporean academic and engineer. He was the founding president of the Nanyang Technological University.

== Early life and education ==
Cham was born in Singapore in 1939. He attended Pasir Panjang Primary School and Raffles Institution. He graduated from the University of Malaya with an honours degree in civil engineering in 1964. Following his graduation from the university, he worked briefly as a consulting engineer and later as a lecturer at the Singapore Polytechnic. Two years after becoming a lecturer, he left Singapore to further his education at the University of London. He graduated from the university with a Bachelor of Science in Mathematics with honours and soon began studying at the University of Cambridge on a Commonwealth Scholarship, where he obtained his Doctor of Philosophy in Fluid Mechanics.

== Career ==
In 1969, Cham became a lecturer at the University of Singapore. In 1974, he served as the honorary treasurer of the Council of Singapore Institution of Engineers. From January 1977 to 1981, he served as a member of the Science Council of Singapore. In the same year, he became a Senior Lecturer and then an Associate Professor of Mechanical and Production Engineering. In 1978, he became the Dean of the Engineering Faculty of the university, a role which he held until 1983, as well as the vice-president of the council of the Singapore Institution of Engineers. He was made a Chevalier dans l'Ordre des Palmes académiques in 1979. From 1980 to 1981, he served as the council's president. In 1981, he was appointed the president of the newly established Nanyang Technological Institute. From 1982 to 2002, he served as the director of Keppel Holdings. In 1983, he was appointed a professor of the institute. He began serving as the Director of WBL Corporation Limited in 1985. He was awarded the Public Administration Medal in 1986. From 1986 to 1999, he served as the chairman of Wearnes Technology Pte Ltd. He began serving as the chairman of National Iron and Steel Mills in 1988. In 1991, the institute became a university and was renamed the Nanyang Technological University. He served as the chairman of the National Institute of Education Council in the following year. From 1997 to 1998, he served as the vice chairman of the Board of Directors of the Singapore Symphony Orchestra. He was appointed the board's chairman in 1999, a role which he held until 2010. On 4 January 2001, he was appointed a member of the Board of Trustees of United Overseas Bank Limited. In the same year, he began serving as the director of Robinson and Company Limited.

Cham continued to serve as the president of NTU until 2002. In the following year, he was appointed Distinguished University Professor and began serving as the chairman of the Nanyang Academy of Fine Arts Management Committee. He was also awarded the Distinguished Service Order. In March 2004, he became the director of Singapore Press Holdings. He served on the Council of Presidential Advisers from 2004 to 2010. He began serving as a member of the Board of Governors of the Singapore International Foundation and the chairman of the Board of Trustees of SIM University in 2005. In 2006, he was awarded the Royal Academy of Engineering Inaugural International Medal. He began serving as the chancellor of SIM University in the same year. In 2008, he was elected the director of the Board of Trustees of United Overseas Bank Limited and served as the chairman of the Board of Governors of Raffles Junior College. From January 2009 to 2010, he served as the deputy chairman of the Board of Governors of Raffles Institution. He became the board's chairman in 2011. In 2015, he received the Engineer of the Year Award from the Federation of Engineering Institutions of Asia and the Pacific. He was involved in the establishment of the Singapore Rail Academy in 2016. He and Tan Gee Paw received the Distinguished Professional Engineer Award on 17 November 2018. His autobiography, titled Life At Speed, was published in 2020.

Cham is a fellow of the Institution of Engineers Singapore, the Institution of Mechanical Engineers and the Royal Academy of Engineering. He has received honorary degrees from the University of Strathclyde, the University of Surrey, Loughborough University and Soka University. He has also served as the director of the UOB subsidiaries Far Eastern Bank and United Overseas Bank (China), and the chairman of MFS Technology and the Singapore China Foundation.

== Personal life ==
Cham married Teo Ee Lin in 1965. They have one son and one daughter.
