= Chiang Chie Foo =

Singaporean civil servant

Chiang Chie Foo DUBC PJG PPA(E)
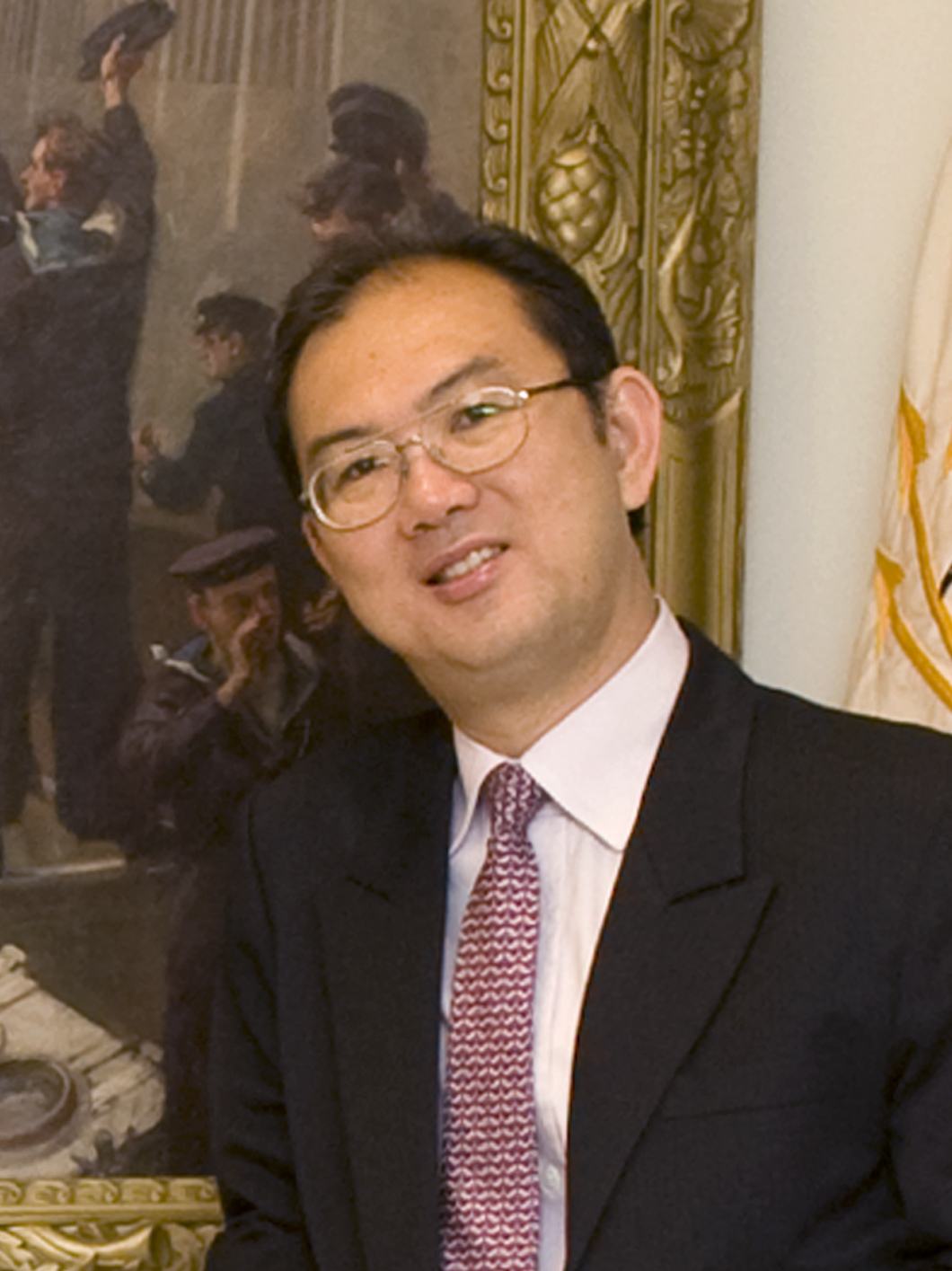
- Chiang in 2011

Chairman of the Public Utilities Board
- In office 1 April 2017 – 31 March 2025
- Preceded by: Tan Gee Paw
- Succeeded by: Chan Lai Fung

Chairman of the Central Provident Fund Board
- In office 1 July 2013 – 30 June 2021
- Preceded by: Koh Yong Guan
- Succeeded by: Yong Ying-I

Chairman of the Energy Market Authority
- In office 1 April 2001 – 1 April 2009
- Preceded by: Office established
- Succeeded by: Chan Lai Fung

Chairman of the Public Utilities Board
- In office 1 January 2001 – 1 April 2001
- Preceded by: Lee Ek Tieng
- Succeeded by: Khoo Chin Hean

Chairman of the Telecommunications Authority of Singapore
- In office 1 December 1997 – 1 December 1999
- Preceded by: Teo Ming Kian
- Succeeded by: Office abolished

Director of the Internal Security Department
- In office 1 March 1993 – 31 March 1997
- Preceded by: Tjong Yik Min
- Succeeded by: Benny Lim Siang Hoe

Personal details
- Born: 1957 (age 68–69)
- Children: 2
- Education: Harvard Kennedy School (MPA); University of Western Australia (BEng); Victoria School

Chinese name
- Traditional Chinese: 鄭子富
- Simplified Chinese: 郑子富
Transcriptions
Standard Mandarin
- Hanyu Pinyin: Zhèng Zǐfù
- IPA: [ʈʂə̂ŋ.tsɹ̩̀.fû]

Chiang Chie Foo (Note: Chinese: see Chinese name and romanisations) DUBC PJG PPA(E) (born c. 1957) is a former Singaporean civil servant and the former chairman of the Public Utilities Board.

Chiang served as permanent secretary for the Ministry of Education (1999–2004), Ministry of Defence (2004–2013) and Prime Minister's Office (2005–2011). He also served as director of the Internal Security Department (1993–1997), and chairman of the Telecommunications Authority of Singapore (1997–1999), Energy Market Authority (2001–2009) and Central Provident Fund (2013–2021). Chiang was a director of ComfortDelGro from 2018 to 2022.

== Education ==
Chiang Chie Foo attended Victoria School and obtained a Singapore-Cambridge GCE Ordinary Level in 1973. Upon graduation in 1975, he was awarded a Colombo Plan scholarship to study at the University of Western Australia. In 1978, Chiang graduated with first class honours, obtaining a Bachelor of Engineering in electronic engineering.

Under a Fulbright scholarship, Chiang obtained a Master of Public Administration from Harvard Kennedy School in 1988.

== Career ==
In 1981, Chiang joined the Ministry of Finance. A year later, Chiang was transferred to the Ministry of Education (MOE). In 1985, to address the shortage of manpower, Chiang proposed a scheme to encourage former teachers to teach part-time. He was also involved planning the location of new schools and setting the College of Physical Education (merged to form the National Institute of Education).

After graduating from Harvard Kennedy School, Chiang worked in the Ministry of Defence (MINDEF), serving as the head of control and manpower. In 1990, he was appointed as principal private secretary to Deputy Prime Minister Goh Chok Tong, replacing Tan Jee Say. Chiang held the role until 1992, where he was transferred to the Ministry of Home Affairs as a senior deputy director. On 1 March 1993, Chiang succeeded Tjong Yik Min as director of the Internal Security Department (ISD).

On 1 April 1997, due to the ministry's "size and complexity", Chiang was appointed as the second permanent secretary for MOE. As such, Benny Lim Siang Hoe took over as director of ISD. On 1 December 1997, he was appointed as chairman of the Telecommunications Authority of Singapore (TAS), replacing Teo Ming Kian. To develop Singapore into an infocommunications hub, Chiang unveiled a S$253 million fund to develop infrastructure, and conduct research and development. S$89 million was set aside to develop Singapore ONE, a nationwide high-speed broadband project.

On 8 June 1999, Chiang succeeded Lim Siong Guan as permanent secretary for MOE. Appointed by Deputy Prime Minister Tony Tan, Chiang was the chairman of a committee to propose solutions for the National University of Singapore and Nanyang Technological University to have more autonomy in managing funds and manpower needs.

On 1 January 2001, Chiang took over as chairman of the Public Utilities Board (PUB), replacing Lee Ek Tieng. However, on 1 April 2001, Chiang was transferred to the newly created Energy Market Authority (EMA) to serve as chairman, and Khoo Chin Hean took over as chairman of PUB. Later in April, he also announced plans for education officers to receive better remuneration and more defined career tracks. The plan cost MOE an additional S$173 million, and almost 2,800 education officers were promoted.

On 15 July 2004, Chiang succeeded Peter Ho as permanent secretary for MINDEF. On 18 November 2005, Chiang assumed an additional portfolio, succeeding Eddie Teo as permanent secretary for the Prime Minister's Office (PMO). On 9 October 2007, Chiang signed an agreement with India Defence Secretary Vijay Singh to conduct joint military exercises. On 1 April 2009, he was succeeded by Chan Lai Fung as chairman of EMA.

On 1 September 2011, Benny Lim Siang Hoe took over Chiang as permanent secretary for PMO. On 1 July 2013, Chiang was appointed as chairman of the Central Provident Fund, replacing Koh Yong Guan. After a 32-year career in the public service, Chiang retired on 1 September 2013, with Chan Yeng Kit taking over as permanent secretary for MINDEF.

On 1 April 2017, Chiang took over from Tan Gee Paw as chairman of PUB. On 30 June 2021, Chiang stepped down as chairman of CPF, with Yong Ying-I succeeding him. On 30 March 2025, Chiang stepped down as chairman of PUB, with Chan Lai Fung succeeding him.

== Personal life ==
Chiang is married with two children.

== Awards and decorations ==
- Distinguished Service Order, in 2019.
- Meritorious Service Medal, in 2007.
- Public Administration Medal (Gold), in 1997.
- Order of the White Elephant (1st Class), in 2013.
