= Singapore International Foundation =

Singaporean not-for-profit organisation

- Native name: 新加坡国际基金会 (Chinese); Yayasan Antarabangsa Singapura (Malay) சிங்கப்பூர் சர்வதேச அறக்கட்டளை (Tamil)
- Type: Not-for-profit
- Industry: Volunteer, culture, arts
- Founded: 1 August 1991; 35 years ago Singapore
- Founder: Ngiam Tong Dow; Lim Pin; Cheong Choong Kong
- Headquarters: 60A Orchard Road #04-01 Tower 1 The Atrium@Orchard; International Involvement Hub; Singapore 238890
- Revenue: 10,892,178 Singapore dollar (2023)
- Total assets: 38,003,643 Singapore dollar (2023)
- Number of employees: 55 (2023)
- Website: sif.org.sg

The Singapore International Foundation (SIF) is a not-for-profit organisation aimed at building trust and understanding with other nations through programmes and initiatives.

== History ==
On 1 August 1991, the organisation was registered. The founding members were Ngiam Tong Dow, Lim Pin and Cheong Choong Kong. The board of directors was chaired by Lee Seng Wee, and other prominent board members included Ridzwan Dzafir, Michael Fam, Tommy Koh and Lee Ek Tieng.

== Programmes ==
=== Arts for Good ===
The Arts for Good initiative enables collaboration between Singaporean and international artists to promote awareness of social issues and share best practices, as well as galvanise community involvement.

=== Friendship Express ===
Fifty Asian youths of eight nationalities – Burmese, Chinese, Indian, Indonesian, Filipino, Malaysian, Singaporean and Thai – participated in the Singapore International Foundation's inaugural Friendship Express programme for bridging communities from 11 to 23 June 2012.

=== Young Social Entrepreneurs ===
The Young Social Entrepreneurs Programme helps participants learn the fundamentals of starting a social enterprise. Participants work on refining business plans while gaining exposure to numerous social enterprises via field trips. The programme encourages participants to share knowledge and experience in the areas of business plan development, enterprise structure, social impact assessment, and fundraising.

=== Young Business Ambassadors ===
The Young Business Ambassadors (YBA) Programme was first mooted at the second meeting of the Singapore-Australia Joint Ministerial Committee in Singapore on 22 February 1999.

Apart from creating opportunities for young professionals to interact, network and share vocational experiences, the programme started with the aim of promoting strategic trade and investment opportunities between Singapore, China and Australia.

The Singapore-Australia YBA Programme was inaugurated in March 2000 with Australian partner Asialink Centre. As SIF's first YBA programme, the new initiative was endorsed by private and public sectors in both countries.

The Singapore-Chinese YBA programme was inaugurated in 2004, when a Memorandum of Understanding was signed between SIF, the Shanghai Municipal Office for the Introduction of Foreign Experts and the Shanghai People's Association for Friendship with Foreign Countries. The first batch of 23 Singapore-China YBAs started their 10-week stint in both countries in June 2004.

=== Visits ===
SIF promotes people-to-people links between Singaporeans and the world through programs such as the SIF Distinguished Visitors Programme, the Eminent Southeast Asians Programme, Temasek Programme, and the Singapore Encore series.

== Past Programmes ==
=== Singapore Executive Expeditions ===
Singapore Executive Expeditions formed in 2005 to provide cross-cultural exposure to executives within the framework of an overseas expedition. Expeditions are held in environments of selected locations to give first-hand appreciation of the cultural heritage, political and social realities and the challenges of international development work.

=== Youth Expedition Project ===
The Youth Expedition Project (YEP) was an initiative pioneered by SIF that took thousands of young Singaporeans on community service expeditions to China, India, and the ASEAN nations between 2000 and 2005.

Launched in 2000 by Deputy Prime Minister Lee Hsien Loong, the vision behind YEP was for Singapore youths to become active and responsible world citizens, and to inspire them through meaningful overseas community service to make a difference to the lives of others, at home and abroad.

YEP at SIF concluded on 31 October 2005. The project moved under the National Youth Council. In its final year, SIF sent 48 teams of 14 young people each to aid Sri Lanka in recovering from the 2004 tsunami crisis.

== See also ==
- Japan Foundation
- Korea Foundation
- SHMZ
