= Peter Ho (disambiguation) =

Peter Ho (born 1975) is an American-Chinese singer, actor, producer, and director.

Peter Ho may also refer to:

- Peter Ho (chairman) (born 1955), Singaporean retired senior civil servant
- Peter Ho Davies (born 1966), British writer of Welsh and Chinese descent
- Peter Aaron Ho (born 1971), better known by his stage name Pete Miser, American hip-hop rapper and producer
