= Andrew Chew =

Singaporean physician (1929–2012)

Andrew Chew Guan Khuan DUNU DUBC PJG PPA(E)
- Chew in 2009

Chairman of the Public Service Commission
- In office 1 August 1998 – 1 August 2008
- Preceded by: Lee Hee Seng
- Succeeded by: Eddie Teo

Chairman of the Central Provident Fund Board
- In office 1 August 1994 – 1 August 1998
- Preceded by: Lim Siong Guan
- Succeeded by: Ngiam Tong Dow

Head of the Singapore Civil Service
- In office 5 September 1984 – 11 October 1994
- Preceded by: Sim Kee Boon
- Succeeded by: Lee Ek Tieng

Personal details
- Born: 11 October 1929 Kuching, Raj of Sarawak
- Died: 29 February 2012 (aged 82) National University Hospital, Singapore
- Spouse: Jennifer Kam Thong Ho
- Children: 2
- Education: University of Malaya in Singapore (MBBS); St. Andrew's School

Chinese name
- Traditional Chinese: 週元管
- Simplified Chinese: 周元管
Transcriptions
Standard Mandarin
- Hanyu Pinyin: Zhōu Yuánguǎn
- IPA: [ʈʂóʊ.yǎn.kwàn]

Andrew Chew Guan Khuan (Note: Chinese: see Chinese name and romanisations) DUNU DUBC PJG PPA(E) (11 October 1929 – 29 February 2012) was a Singaporean physician, former head of the Singapore Civil Service (1984–1994) and former chairman of the Public Service Commission (1998–2008).

An Eisenhower Fellow, Chew also served as chairman of Yaohan Singapore, Singapore Biotech Pte Ltd and the Central Provident Fund.

== Early life and education ==
On 11 October 1929, Andrew Chew Guan Khuan was born in Kuching, Raj of Sarawak. In 1930, his family moved to Singapore, and lived along Jalan Tanah Puteh, located in Bedok. Chew was the eldest, and he had a brother and six sisters. His father worked in the Chartered Bank of Singapore, and his mother was a homemaker.

Chew received his early education at St. Andrew's School. When the Japanese occupation of Singapore occurred, Chew's family moved several times and Chew briefly attended Monk's Hill Secondary School. Eventually, Chew went back to study at St. Andrew's, and in 1947, he graduated with a Senior Cambridge.

Upon graduation, Chew applied to study medicine at the University of Malaya in Singapore. In 1950, Chew passed the preliminary examination, and in 1955, he graduated with a Bachelor of Medicine and Bachelor of Surgery. Chew was an avid rugby player in university, and he represent the faculty of medicine during inter-faculty and inter-college games.

== Medical career ==
At the age of 27, Chew joined the Singapore Civil Service as a medical officer in the Ministry of Health. Under the guidance of Gordon Arthur Ransome, Chew began his career in the General Hospital (GH). In 1959, Chew was sent to London to attend a course leading to a Membership of the Royal Colleges of Physicians of the United Kingdom.

After returning from London in 1960, Chew was transferred to Thomson General Hospital, serving as its senior registrar. In 1964, he was promoted to medical superintendent and transferred to Tan Tock Seng Hospital. Later, he was transferred to Kandang Kerbau Hospital in 1967, and SGH in 1970.

On 12 November 1971, Chew was promoted as deputy director of medical services, the second highest position in the service. Shortly after, in January 1972, Chew announced that the ministry is considering a scheme to make specialists treatments more accessible. To prevent overcrowding at GH and underutilisation of other hospitals, Chew announced a scheme in January 1975 to divide Singapore into four zones, demarcated according to each zone's hospital resources and population size. After the implementation, fewer patients were treated at GH. Chew elaborated during the announcement:

The new scheme is aimed at rationalising the hospital services so that patients' load can be equally shared among the various regional hospitals. All the basic medical services provided will be of equal standard.
Among the factors taken into account in determining the zones were the number of hospital beds available and the size of population in each zone. This is to ensure that there would be no overcrowding or underutilisation. Bus routes were also considered to ensure the medical institutions are accessible within each area.
At the same time, in each zone the outpatient departments and maternal and child health clinics providing "primary medical care" form a ring round the regional hospital.

In 1978, Chew was appointed as permanent secretary in the Ministry of Health and promoted to director of medical services. In July 1978, a group of 70 medical students requested for a meeting with Chew, after the bond for first year medical scholars increased to S$81,000. Minister for Health Toh Chin Chye and Chew agreed to meet with the students to "listen and clarify any queries", but the students could not reach a collective decision on bond signing. As such, Chew and the ministry decided to postpone the mandatory bond signing by the medical students, and reviewed its policy.

In December 1979, medical officers in government hospitals urged for improvement to their employment terms and salary. Due to a shortage in manpower, many of the doctors find themselves working 60 to 80 hours per week, compared to other civil servants who work a normal 44-hour week. As such, in April 1980, Chew called upon retired doctors to work part time, and in May 1980, allowance was increased for doctors, dentists, specialists and registrars.

In August 1982, Chew was appointed as chairman of Yaohan Singapore. In September 1983, Chew was also appointed as chairman of Singapore Biotech Pte Ltd. The company was established by the government to produce hepatitis B vaccines, under licence from Merck, Sharp and Dohme, for local usage and export to ASEAN and other countries such as Hong Kong. The S$5 million plant was capable of producing six million doses of the vaccine.

== Post-medical career ==
In February 1984, Chew left the Ministry of Health to assume three new portfolios. He became the deputy head of the Singapore Civil Service, second permanent secretary of the public service division in the Ministry of Finance, and permanent secretary for special duties in the Prime Minister's Office.

On 5 September 1984, Chew succeeded Sim Kee Boon as head of the civil service, while continuing his other two portfolios. On 15 May 1985, Chew was part of the delegation that flew on the inaugural flight to Beijing via Shanghai, operated by Singapore Airlines. On 30 September 1986, Chew officially opened a S$14 million clubhouse for civil servants, located along Tessensohn Road in Kallang. In 1988, Chew was also part of the initial board of governors for the Institute of Policy Studies.

On 1 August 1994, Chew was appointed as chairman of the Central Provident Fund. After more than 10 years serving as its head, Chew retired from the civil service on 11 October 1994. Chew was appointed as a director of Centrepoint Properties Ltd in November 1994 and Overseas Union Bank in January 1997.

On 17 October 1997, Chew was appointed as a member of the Public Service Commission (PSC), and on 1 August 1998, Chew succeeded Lee Hee Seng as chairman of PSC. On 1 August 2008, Chew retired and was replaced by Eddie Teo.

== Personal life ==
Chew was married Jennifer Kam Thong Ho, and they have a daughter and son.

In 2012, Chew underwent a cardiac valve surgery at the National University Hospital, but suffered from postoperative complications. On 29 February 2012, Chew died of a heart failure.

== Awards and decorations ==
- Order of Nila Utama (2nd Class, 2008).
- Distinguished Service Order (2002).
- Meritorious Service Medal (1994).
- Public Administration Medal (Gold) (1975).
