= OTM =

OTM may refer to:

- Two CNBC shows:
  - On the Money (2005 TV series)
  - On the Money (2013 TV series)
- On the Media, a show syndicated on National Public Radio
- Operations and technology management
- Ottumwa station, Iowa, United States, Amtrak station code OTM
- Ottumwa Regional Airport, Iowa, United States, IATA code OTM
- Out of the money options
- Out the Mud, a professional wrestling tag team
