= Chong Chi Tat =

University Professor of Mathematical Science in Singapore

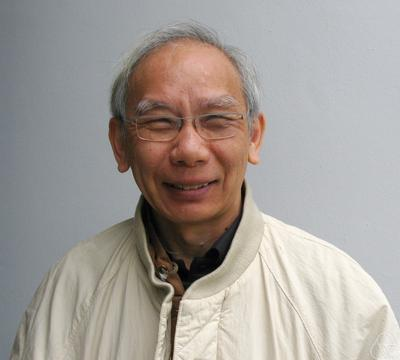
Chong Chi Tat

Chong Chi Tat (Chinese: 莊志達; pinyin: Zhuāng Zhìdá) is university professor and director of the Institute for Mathematical Sciences at the National University of Singapore (NUS). His research interests are in the areas of recursion/computability theory.

== Academic career ==
Chong received his BSc with distinction from Iowa State University and his PhD from Yale University. He began his career in University of Singapore, the predecessor of NUS, as a lecturer in 1974. He was subsequently promoted to senior lecturer (1980–1985), associate professor (1985–1989), and professor (1989–2004). Chong held many administrative leadership positions, including vice dean of science (1985–1996), department head of information systems and computer science (1993–1996), deputy vice chancellor, deputy president and provost (1996–2004); and department head of mathematics (2006–2012). In 2004, Chong was named the second University professor of NUS, the highest honor bestowed upon a very small number of its tenured faculty members.

== Selected works ==
- Chi Tat Chong, Theodore A Slaman and Yue Yang, The inductive strength of Ramsey's Theorem for Pairs, Advances in Mathematics 308 (2017), 121–141.
- Chi Tat Chong, Theodore A Slaman and Yue Yang, The metamathematics of stable Ramsey’s theorem for pairs, Journal of the American Mathematical Society 27 (2014), 863-892.
- Chi Tat Chong, Theodore A Slaman and Yue Yang, Pi^1_1 conservation of combinatorial principles weaker than Ramsey’s theorem for pairs, Advances in Mathematics 230 (2012), 1060-1071.
- Chi Tat Chong and Yue Yang, The jump of a Sigma_n cut, Journal of the London Mathematical Society 75 (2007), 690—704.
- Chi Tat Chong and Yue Yang, Σ_2 induction and infinite injury priority argument. I. Maximal sets and the jump operator. Journal of Symbolic Logic 63 (1998), no. 3, 797–814.

== Awards and honors ==
Chong received the Pingat Pentadbiran Awam - Emas (Public Administration Medal - Gold), in Singapore's National Day Awards 2002. He has been a Fellow of the Singapore National Academy of Science since 2011.
