= Lim Ming Yan =

Singaporean business executive and chairman

- 林明彦

High Commissioner to the Republic of Mauritius (Non-Resident)
- Incumbent
- Assumed office 11 January 2022
- Minister: Vivian Balakrishnan
- Preceded by: R. Jayachandran

Chairman, NS Square Ltd.
- Incumbent
- Assumed office 1 January 2024

Chairman, The Esplanade Co Ltd.
- Incumbent
- Assumed office 1 April 2024

Chairman, Changi Airport Group
- Incumbent
- Assumed office 1 April 2025

Chairman, Singapore Business Federation
- In office June 2020 – May 2025

Chairman, Workforce Singapore
- In office 2016–2022
- Board member of: Business China; Singapore Press Holdings; Central China Real Estate; DLF Cyber City Developers Ltd

Personal details
- Born: February 1963 (age 63)
- Education: University of Birmingham (BSc); Harvard Business School (AMP)
- Awards: Shanghai Magnolia Award (2003, 2005); Outstanding Chief Executive (Overseas), Singapore Business Awards (2006)

Lim Ming Yan (Chinese: 林明彦; born February 1963) is the Chairman of NS Square Ltd., The Esplanade Co Ltd and Changi Airport Group. He was formerly the Chairman of Singapore Business Federation (SBF) and Workforce Singapore (WSG). He is also currently Singapore's Non-Resident High Commissioner to the Republic of Mauritius. He was formerly the president and group chief executive officer (CEO) of CapitaLand.

Lim is a member of Singapore's Future Economy Council and a board member of Business China, Singapore Press Holdings, Central China Real Estate and DLF Cyber City Developers Ltd.

== Education ==
Lim graduated from the University of Birmingham, UK in 1985 with a Bachelor of Science (First-class honours) in Mechanical Engineering and Economics and was later conferred an honorary doctorate (Doctor of the University) by the university in 2015.

Lim attended the Advanced Management Program at Harvard Business School in 2002.

== Career ==
Lim joined the CapitaLand Group in 1996. He served as the CEO of CapitaLand China Holdings Limited after being posted there in 2000. After returning to Singapore in 2009, he became the CEO of The Ascott Limited. He relinquished his position in February 2012 after becoming CapitaLand's COO in May of the prior year. From 1 January 2013, Lim served as CapitaLand's president and group CEO, succeeding the founding CEO Liew Mun Leong. He retired from CapitaLand at the end of 2018, after more than 22 years of service in the company.

Lim was appointed as the chairman of SBF during its 18th Annual General Meeting on 30 June 2020. He succeeded Teo Siong Seng, who previously served as chairman for 6 years, and is part of the SBF Council's two-year term from 2020 to 2022. Lim served for 5 years before being succeeded again by Teo Siong Seng on 20 May 2025.

On 11 January 2022, Lim was appointed as Singapore's Non-Resident High Commissioner to the Republic of Mauritius. Lim presented his Letter of Credence to the President of the Republic of Mauritius, Mr Prithvirajsing Roopun, on 27 June 2022.

On 27 December 2024, Lim was appointed as the Chairman of Changi Airport Group, officially taking over from Tan Gee Paw on 1 April 2025.

== Awards ==
Lim received the Magnolia Award from the Shanghai Municipal Government in 2003 and 2005 for his contributions to Shanghai. He was named Outstanding Chief Executive (Overseas) at the Singapore Business Awards in 2006 for his service as CEO of CapitaLand China.
