= Peter Seah =

Singaporean businessman (born 1947)

Peter Seah Lim Huat DUNU DUBC BBM
- 佘林发
- Born: 1947 (age 78–79); Colony of Singapore
- Occupations: Chairman of DBS Bank and Singapore Airlines

Peter Seah Lim Huat DUNU DUBC BBM (Chinese: 佘林发; pinyin: Shé Línfā; born 1947) is a business executive. He is serving as the chairman of DBS Bank and Singapore Airlines. Previously he worked with Citibank, and Overseas Union Bank, where he held various senior positions until he became the CEO and Vice-Chairman in 1991.

== Early life and career ==
After completing his education, Seah started working. He began as a sales executive, and later left for Citibank, and became the Country Head in Brunei. In 1977, Seah moved to the Overseas Union Bank and became the CEO by 1991, as well as the Vice-chairman position.

In December 2001, Seah was appointed to the CapitaLand Board in Singapore. He would become its deputy chairman on 1 January 2009.

Seah's involvement with ST Engineering began in 2001 when he joined the company's board of directors.

Seah joined the board of directors of DBS Group Holdings and DBS Bank on 16 November 2009, and became the chairman on 1 May 2010. He also served as the chairman of the branch in Hong Kong. In 2017 Seah took over as the Chairman of Singapore Airlines.

== Awards and decorations ==
- Public Service Star, in 1999.
- Distinguished Service Order, in 2012.
- Order of Nila Utama (with Distinction), in 2021.
