= Pingat Gagah Perkasa (Tentera) =

Singapore Armed Forces award

Pingat Gagah Perkasa (Tentera) (Conspicuous Gallantry Medal (Military))
- Ribbon
- Type: Medal
- Awarded for: Heroic act of courage and sacrifice, or for outstanding conduct and performance, and selfless devotion to the Service over and above the call of duty
- Presented by: Singapore
- Eligibility: Members of the Singapore Armed Forces
- Status: Active
- Established: 1981

Precedence
- Next (higher): Darjah Utama Bakti Cemerlang (Tentera)
- Equivalent: Pingat Gagah Perkasa
- Next (lower): Pingat Jasa Gemilang (Tentera)

The Pingat Gagah Perkasa (Tentera) (English: Conspicuous Gallantry Medal (Military)) is a decoration awarded to members of the Singapore Armed Forces for a heroic act of courage and sacrifice, or for outstanding conduct and performance, and selfless devotion to the Service over and above the call of duty. Recipients are entitled to use the post-nominal letters PGP. The Pingat Gagah Perkasa is the civil equivalent award.

The medal was established in 1981 among 10 medals established to be awarded to those who had displayed exceptional and disinguished service to the Singapore Armed Forces.

== Description ==
- The ribbon is purple with 4 white stripes.
