= Jammy Shah Al-Islam =

Bruneian police commissioner

Dato Paduka Seri Jammy Shah Al-Islam DPKT PSPNB SMB PSB PJK PIKB PKLP
- جم شاه الإسلام
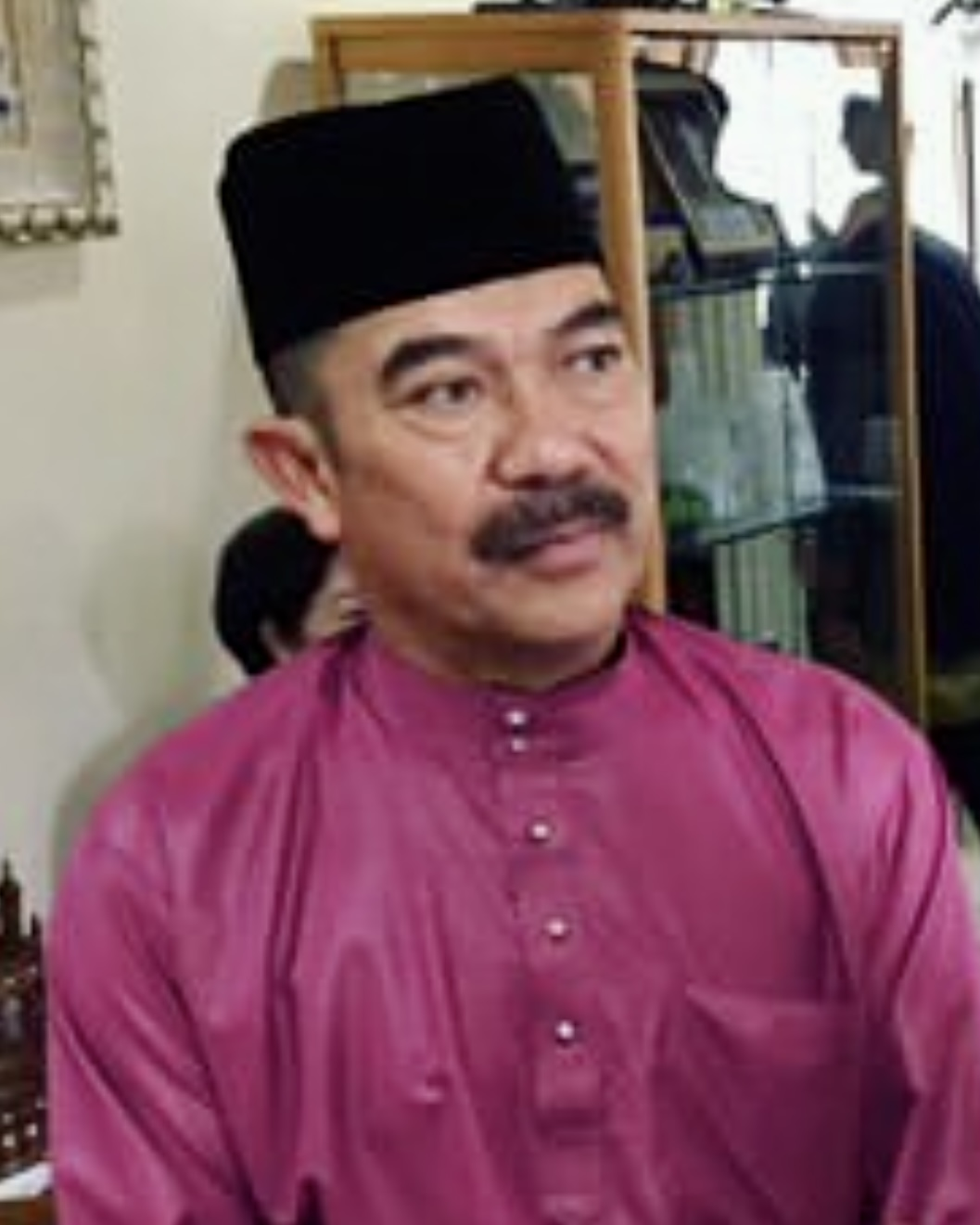
- Jammy in 2016

Commissioner of Police
- In office 29 May 2016 – 23 June 2019
- Monarch: Hassanal Bolkiah
- Deputy: Irwan Hambali
- Preceded by: Bahrin Mohd Noor
- Succeeded by: Irwan Hambali

Personal details
- Born: Brunei
- Police career
- Country: Brunei
- Department: Royal Brunei Police Force
- Rank: Commissioner

Mohamad Jammy bin Haji Muhd Shah Al-Islam is a retired Bruneian police officer who served as the police commissioner of the Royal Brunei Police Force (RBPF) from 2016 to 2019.

== Police career ==
Jammy prior to assuming the role of police commissioner on 29 May 2016, has served as the deputy commissioner under Bahrin Mohd Noor. In August 2017, Vladimir Kolokoltsev met with Jammy to discuss the development of cooperation between the Russian Ministry of Internal Affairs and ASEAN counterparts.

The RBPF placed a high priority on strengthening border security in February 2017. They did this by establishing a quick information sharing system with their Malaysian colleagues and highlighting the strategic importance of Brunei's location between Sarawak and Sabah. Jammy emphasized the talks he had with the Sabah Police Commissioner on the setup of this system and ways to improve security for visitors from Brunei and Malaysia. Jammy established the Bandar Seri Begawan police station's cycling police squad on 11 August 2018, at the Taman Mahkota Jubli Emas.

Jammy emphasised that they need to go to the next level and encourage police officers to leave their comfort zones in order to focus on identifying not only current crime trends but also any new threats, as well as developing the appropriate plan and strategy between the two police forces, during the 12th Bilateral Meeting between the Singapore Police Force (SPF) and the RBPF.

From 22 to 23 January 2019, the RBPF hosted the 9th ASEANAPOL Training Cooperation Meeting (ATCM). Jammy presided over the event, highlighting ASEANAPOL as the primary law enforcement organisation in the region and emphasising the organisation's continued efforts to fortify its capabilities in combating and solving crimes through efficient policing tactics and operations.

On 23 June 2019, at the police headquarters in Gadong, Jammy signed the letter transferring his duties to Irwan Hambali after serving his entire term. A Bruneian boy named Muhd Nazrul Hadi Bin Kamis had been diagnosed with Retinoblastoma, and at the event in July 2019, Jammy awarded him a diploma titled "Honorary Policeman."

== Honours ==
On 18 May 2017, President Tony Tan Keng Yam awarded Jammy the DUBC in recognition of his contribution to fortifying the close, bilateral relationship between the SPF and the RBPF.

National

Jammy has been given the following honours:

- Order of Paduka Keberanian Laila Terbilang First Class (DPKT; 15 July 2016) – Dato Paduka Seri
- Order of Pahlawan Negara Brunei First Class (PSPNB; 15 August 2015) – Dato Seri Pahlawan
- Order of Seri Paduka Mahkota Brunei Third Class (SMB)
- Order of Setia Negara Brunei Fourth Class (PSB)
- Meritorious Service Medal (PJK)
- Excellent Service Medal (PIKB)
- Police Long Service Medal (PKLP)
- Proclamation of Independence Medal (1997)
- Sultan of Brunei Silver Jubilee Medal (5 October 1992)
- Sultan of Brunei Golden Jubilee Medal (5 October 2017)
- National Day Silver Jubilee Medal (23 February 2009)
- General Service Medal (Police)
- Police 75 Years Medal (1996)

Foreign

- Indonesia
  - Bintang Bhayangkara Utama (14 February 2018)
- Singapore:
  - Darjah Utama Bakti Cemerlang (DUBC; 18 May 2017)

Police appointments
Preceded by Bahrin Mohd Noor	Commissioner of Police	Succeeded by Irwan Hambali
