= Pingat Kehormatan =

Award for distinguished service in Singaporean army or police

Pingat Kehormatan (Medal of Honour)
- Type: Medal
- Established: 1970; 55 years ago
- Country: Singapore
- Eligibility: Members of the Singapore Armed Forces or Singapore Police Force
- Awarded for: Distinguished conduct
- Status: Active

Precedence
- Next (higher): Darjah Utama Bakti Cemerlang
- Next (lower): Pingat Gagah Perkasa
- Ribbon after 1996 Ribbon prior to 1996

The Pingat Kehormatan (English: Medal of Honour) is a Singaporean national honour instituted in 1970. It is a medal awarded to any member of the Singapore Armed Forces or the Singapore Police Force who has performed "any act or series of acts constituting distinguished conduct in active service in the field". In special circumstances, it may also be awarded to any person who performed an act which constitute as distinguished conduct while engaged active field service. The medal may be awarded posthumously. However, it has never been awarded since its inception.
