= NUS university professor =

Title at the National University of Singapore

The title of university professor at the National University of Singapore (NUS) is given to a small number of faculty members for outstanding scholarship and distinguished service to the university. The title was first awarded to Lim Pin in 2000. Presently, there are only six university professors in NUS.

== Present National University of Singapore university professors ==
- Chong Chi Tat, mathematician in recursion/computability theory; former deputy vice chancellor, deputy president and provost of the National University of Singapore from 1996 to 2004.
- Lim Pin, longest-serving vice chancellor
- Shih Choon Fong, fracture mechanics expert; former president of the National University of Singapore and the King Abdullah University of Science and Technology
- Tan Chorh Chuan, former president of the National University of Singapore from 2008 to 2017; inaugural Chief Health Scientist and Executive Director of the new Office for Healthcare Transformation in Singapore’s Ministry of Health.
- Wang Gungwu, historian of China and Southeast Asia; former chairman of the East Asian Institute and chairman of the managing board of the Lee Kuan Yew School of Public Policy, National University of Singapore; former vice chancellor of the University of Hong Kong.
- Teck-Hua Ho, behavioural scientist; former senior deputy president and provost of the National University of Singapore (NUS); current president of Nanyang Technological University.
