= Lee Ek Tieng =

Singaporean bureaucrat (1933–2025)

Lee Ek Tieng DUBC PJG
- 李一添
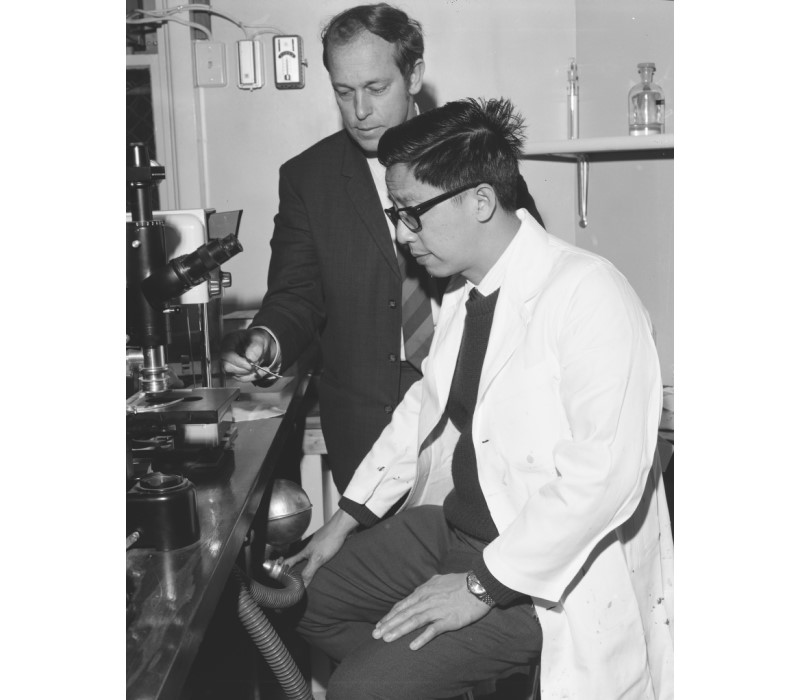
- Lee in New Zealand in 1970

Permanent Secretary of the Ministry of the Environment
- In office 1972–1986
- Prime Minister: Lee Kuan Yew
- Preceded by: Position established

Head of the Public Utilities Board
- In office 1978–2000
- Prime Minister: Lee Kuan Yew; Goh Chok Tong
- Preceded by: Lim Kim San
- Succeeded by: Chiang Chie Foo

Permanent Secretary of the Ministry of Finance (Revenue)
- In office 1986–1989
- Prime Minister: Lee Kuan Yew

Managing Director of the Monetary Authority of Singapore
- In office November 1989 – December 1997
- Prime Minister: Lee Kuan Yew
- Preceded by: J. Y. Pillay
- Succeeded by: Koh Yong Guan

Managing Director of the Government of Singapore Investment Corporation
- In office 19 November 1989 – 2 July 2007
- Prime Minister: Lee Kuan Yew
- Preceded by: J. Y. Pillay
- Succeeded by: Lim Siong Guan

Head of the Singapore Civil Service
- In office 12 October 1994 – 21 September 1999
- Prime Minister: Goh Chok Tong
- Preceded by: Andrew Chew
- Succeeded by: Lim Siong Guan

Personal details
- Born: 21 September 1933 Perak, Federated Malay States, British Malaya
- Died: 6 April 2025 (aged 91) Singapore
- Spouse: Patricia Lee
- Children: 2
- Education: University of Malaya (BS); Newcastle University

Chinese name
- Chinese: 李一添
Transcriptions
Standard Mandarin
- Hanyu Pinyin: Lǐ Yītiān
Eastern Min
- Fuzhou BUC: Lī Ék-tiĕng

Lee Ek Tieng DUBC PJG (21 September 1933 – 6 April 2025) was a Singaporean bureaucrat. As Permanent Secretary of the Ministry of the Environment, Lee oversaw the cleaning of Singapore's rivers. He also held leadership positions at the Monetary Authority of Singapore, the Public Utilities Board, and the Government of Singapore Investment Corporation. From 1994 to 1999, Lee was the head of the Singapore Civil Service.

== Early life and education ==
The seventh of eight children, Lee was born on 21 September 1933 in Perak, British Malaya. His father was a Methodist pastor. Lee and his family were left stranded in Singapore after arriving in the country for a Methodist conference shortly before the outbreak of World War II. They eventually decided to stay there for good.

Lee attended Anglo-Chinese School and was the captain of its table tennis team. In 1958, Lee graduated from the University of Malaya with a Bachelor of Science in civil engineering. In 1965, he obtained a diploma in public health engineering from Newcastle University on a Colombo Plan scholarship.

== Career ==
=== Early years ===
In 1958, Lee joined the City Council (later the Public Works Department) as an engineer and was responsible for drafting Singapore's first Sewerage Master Plan. In 1970, he was appointed the first head of the Anti-Pollution Unit (comprising himself, Phang Phui Yong, and Chua Yong Hai) at the Prime Minister's Office. Lee was posted to Australia and New Zealand for seven months to study their pollution management methods.

From 1971 to 1972, Lee was the Permanent Secretary (Special Duties) of the Ministry of Health, succeeding Tan Teck Khim. As head of the ministry's Singapore Family Planning and Population Board (SFPPB), Lee established an Information, Education and Communication unit that was responsible for the "Stop at Two" campaign.

=== Ministry of the Environment ===
In 1972, Lee became the first Permanent Secretary of the Ministry of the Environment. He quickly ordered the ministry to establish a network of sewage pipes that would send waste to centralised treatment plants, thus supplanting the preexisting "night soil" system. Since there were only two sewage treatment plants at the time, Lee also called for four more plants to be built. The objectives of Lee's directive were satisfied in 1980, by which time the ministry had spent S$1.8 billion overhauling the national sewerage system.

Lee and his team also successfully lobbied the government to adopt incineration as a means of waste disposal. Construction of Singapore's first waste incineration plant—which also became the first in Asia outside of Japan—was approved in 1973 and took about six years to finish.

On 27 February 1977, Prime Minister Lee Kuan Yew challenged Lee and his team at the Ministry of the Environment to clean up Singapore's waterways—especially the Singapore River and the Kallang Basin—within ten years. He also pledged to give those spearheading the effort a solid gold medal each, should they be successful.

In addition to banning bumboats, hawkers, and squatters from the area, Lee Ek Tieng commissioned contractors to dredge the bed of the Singapore River by 1 metre (3 ft 3 in) and replace its mud and waste with sand. This resulted in the stench that had hung in the air for years disappearing within a week.

The entire operation, which ended up costing approximately S$300 million, was deemed a success, as evidenced by the return of fish and other sea creatures to the Singapore River. A Clean River Commemoration was held at the Marina Mandarin on 2 September 1987. As Lee Kuan Yew had promised a decade ago, Lee Ek Tieng and nine other civil servants (Note: Namely, Chen Hung, Chiang Kok Meng, Loh Ah Tuan, T.K. Pillai, Tan Gee Paw, Tan Teng Huat, Wang Nan Chee, Wong Keng Mun, and George Yeo.) were each presented with a solid gold medal worth around S$1,000. Lee Kuan Yew later remarked in his memoirs: "There would have been no clean and green Singapore without Lee Ek Tieng."

=== Public Utilities Board ===
In September 1978, while he was still overseeing the cleaning of Singapore's rivers, Lee succeeded Lim Kim San as head of the Public Utilities Board (PUB). Together with Tan Gee Paw, Lee—then the head of Singapore's Water Planning Unit—had drafted the country's first water master plan in 1972, which emphasised that Singapore needed to be at least 75 per cent self-sufficient in water. After assuming leadership of the PUB, Lee made the production of reclaimed water one of his top priorities. However, this cost around S$7 or S$8 per 1,000 imperial gallons (4,500 L; 1,200 US gal) at the time, which forced Lee to focus on the creation of reservoirs as another means of shoring up Singapore's water supply.

At Lee's suggestion, the government passed legislation that made the transport of hazardous substances subject to the approval of the Ministry of the Environment. This meant that the ministry could dictate the routes by which such chemicals would be transported, thus reducing the likelihood of reservoir water being contaminated by toxic waste.

When the technology became more cost-efficient in the late 1990s, Lee greenlit the construction of a Bedok-based facility that would produce 2,200,000 imperial gallons (10,000,000 L; 2,600,000 US gal) of reclaimed water each day. Water reclamation at the plant involved a combination of microfiltration, reverse osmosis, and ultraviolet radiation. Mindful that there was a "yuck factor" to reclaimed water, Lee christened the PUB's product "NEWater". As he reasoned, "Something 'new' will always attract attention. The word NEWater is neutral, it doesn't tell you the source of the water."

=== Later years ===
Lee left the Ministry of the Environment in 1986 to become Permanent Secretary of the Ministry of Finance's Revenue division, a position that he held until 1989. He was appointed a director of the Monetary Authority of Singapore (MAS) in 1986 and as chairman of Temasek Holdings a year later.

In November 1989, Lee replaced J. Y. Pillay as the managing director of the Government of Singapore Investment Corporation (GIC). He stayed in the position (renamed group managing director in 1999) until July 2007, when he was succeeded by Lim Siong Guan.

From 1991 to 1995, Lee was the chairman of Raffles Country Club. He left the civil service in September 1993, but retained his positions at GIC, the PUB, and the MAS. On 1 June 1994, Lee succeeded Andrew Chew as head of the Singapore Civil Service. He was appointed deputy chairman of the MAS in January 1998, before becoming group managing director in April 1999.

Lee stepped down as head of the civil service on his 66th birthday, 21 September 1999. He was awarded the Darjah Utama Bakti Cemerlang (Distinguished Service Order) in 2000. Lee retired from public service altogether in December of the same year. At the time of his retirement, he was a Staff Grade Administrative Officer—the highest rank in the civil service.

== Personal life and death ==
Lee was married to Patricia. They had two sons.

Lee became an avid golfer in his later years. During his tenure at the Government of Singapore Investment Corporation (GIC), Lee was known for encouraging his colleagues to take up the game, so much so that it became a "running joke" at the company that GIC stood for "Golf Is Compulsory" or "Golf Improvement Club".

In 2019, Lee was diagnosed with dementia. He died on 6 April 2025, at the age of 91.

== Awards and decorations ==
- Pingat Jasa Gemilang (Meritorious Service Medal), in 1984.
- Darjah Utama Bakti Cemerlang (Distinguished Service Order), in 2000.

== Selected works and publications ==
- Lee, Ek Tieng (January–February 1983). "Energy conservation in Singapore". Energy. 8 (1–2): 137–141. Bibcode:1983Ene.....8..137T. doi:10.1016/0360-5442(83)90018-X.
