= Gerard Ee =

Singaporean civil servant

Gerard Ee Hock Kim (Note: Chinese: 余福金; Pe̍h-ōe-jī: Î Hok-kim; pinyin: Yú Fújīn) DUBC PJG BBM PBM (born 1949) is a Singaporean civil servant. He is the son of Ee Peng Liang, a Singaporean philanthropist.

== Career ==
Ee became a member of the Institute of Chartered Accountants in England and Wales in 1972. In 1974 Gerard began his career as an accountant, becoming a practicing auditor in 1976. Gerard was made a Partner of the Ernst and Young accounting firm, where he remained in the position until his retirement on 30 June 2005.

Ee had also served in various capacities as he was a Nominated Member of Parliament from 1997 to 2002. He was appointed the President of the National Council of Social Service (NCSS) from 1 August 2002, and Chairman of the Public Transport Council. He also was a member of the National Medical Ethics Committee, and the Governing Council of Singapore Institute of Management, and chairperson positions for the Medifund Advisory Council, ITE College East Advisory Council, Hai Sing Catholic School Management Committee. Gerard is also the Chairman of the Finance Standing Committee of the North East Community Development Council.

Ee has been a Fellow of the Institute of Certified Public Accountants of Singapore since 2005.

In 2006, Ee retired from his position as President of the National Council of Social Service, and also as President of the Automobile Association of Singapore on 31 May in the same year.

He was appointed as Chairman of Tiger Airways in 2009.

In January 2012, Ee took charge of the Ministerial Salary Review Committee which was in charge of reviewing Singapore ministers' salary. The need for the committee arose because of popular discontent towards ministers being paid too handsome a salary which was particularly notable during the 2011 General Elections as a sensitive topic that was raised on several occasions. Upon Ee's chairmanship of the committee, pay cuts of up to 53 per cent were recommended for the ministers. Other significant suggested changes include the removal of the pension scheme for all political appointment holders and the cut in the President's salary by 51 per cent, which is, for the first time in history, lower than that of the Prime Minister's.

=== National Kidney Foundation scandal ===
Two weeks into his retirement from Ernst and Young, Ee was called upon by the Health Minister Khaw Boon Wan to help restore public confidence in the National Kidney Foundation (NKF), which was dealt with a corruption controversy by the former chief executive officer of the Foundation, T. T. Durai and certain board members. Khaw named Ee, on 15 July 2005, as the interim Chairman and acting CEO of the National Kidney Foundation Singapore and charged him with the task of conducting a full independent audit of NKF in the following week. Ee was officially appointed as NKF chairman on 17 July 2005.

== Awards ==
Ee was awarded the Public Service Medal (PBM) in 1993, the Public Service Star (BBM) in 2001, then was awarded the Meritorious Service Medal (PJG) in 2007 and finally the Distinguished Service Order in 2019.

In 2018, he was awarded Outstanding Lifetime Volunteer Award by the Ministry of Social and Family Development (MSF).

== Personal life ==
Ee is a Roman Catholic and is married with two children.
