= President's Award for the Environment =

National environmental sustainability award from government of Singapore

President’s Award for the Environment
- Description: Honoring significant contributions to environmental sustainability
- Country: Singapore
- Presented by: President of Singapore / Ministry of Sustainability and the Environment

The President’s Award for the Environment was established in 2006 by the Ministry of Sustainability and the Environment of Singapore.

The Award recognizes and honours individuals, organizations and companies which have contributed to Singapore's efforts in achieving environmental sustainability, and is presented by the President of Singapore at the Istana.

== Award recipients ==
2006

- Tommy Koh
- Geh Min
- Waterways Watch Society (WWS)

2007

- Tan Gee Paw
- Leo Tan
- City Developments Limited

2008

- Alexandra Hospital
- Senoko Power Limited
- South West Community Development Council

2009

- Commonwealth Secondary School
- National Youth Achievement Award Council
- ST Microelectronics

2010

- Hitachi Global Storage Technologies (GST) Singapore Pte Ltd
- Nan Hua High School
- Singapore Polytechnic

2011

- Dr Tan Wee Kiat of National Parks Board
- SMRT Corporation
- Woodgrove Secondary School

2012

- HSBC Singapore
- Marsiling Secondary School
- Panasonic Asia Pacific

2013

- Dunman High School
- Fuhua Primary School
- Siloso Beach Resort

2014

- Eugene Heng
- Institute of Technical Education
- Ngee Ann Polytechnic

2015

- Kwek Leng Joo
- Kirtida Mekani
- East View Primary School
- Systems on Silicon Manufacturing Company (SSMC)

2016

- Marsiling Primary School
- Bukit View Secondary School
- Ricoh Asia Pacific Pte Ltd (Ricoh)

2017

- Shawn Kaihekulani Yamauchi Lum (Dr)
- Khoo Teck Puat Hospital
- Anchor Green Primary School

2019

- Elias Park Primary School
- Mee Toh School
- Singtel

2021

- Joseph K H Koh
- Nanyang Girls' High School
- DBS Bank Ltd

2023

- Jacob Tan Guan Rui
- Er. Lee Chuan Seng
- Keppel Corporation

2025

- Simon Tay
- Leong Chee Chiew (posthumously)
- CapitaLand Group

== See also ==
- List of environmental awards
