= Singapore Airlines Flight 117 =

1991 aircraft hijacking in Singapore

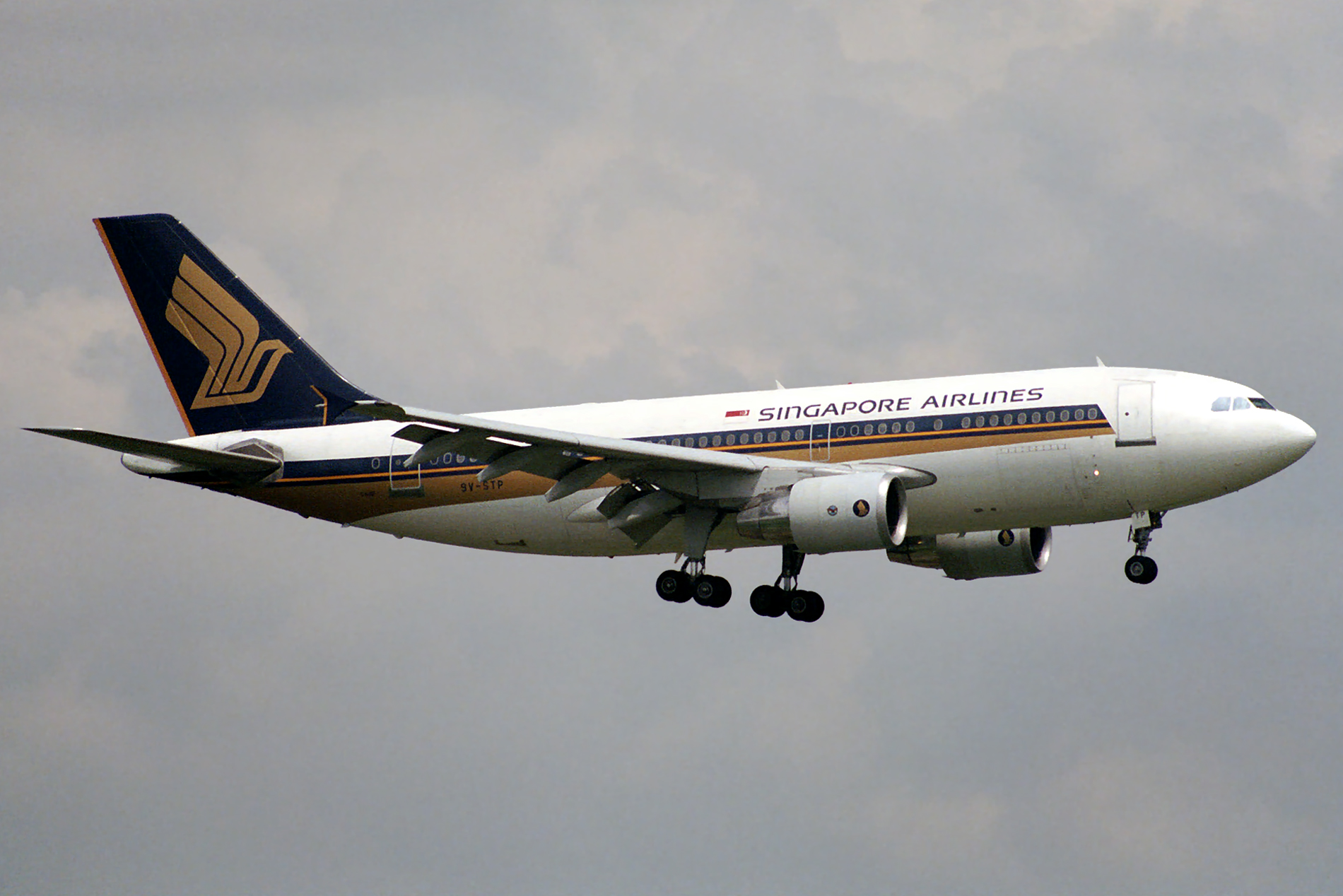
- 9V-STP, the aircraft involved in the hijacking, photographed in 1993

Hijacking
- Date: 26 March 1991 – 27 March 1991
- Summary: Aircraft hijacking
- Site: Changi Airport, Changi, Singapore; 1°22′20″N 103°59′24″E

Aircraft
- Aircraft type: Airbus A310-324
- Operator: Singapore Airlines
- IATA flight No.: SQ117
- ICAO flight No.: SIA117
- Call sign: SINGAPORE 117
- Registration: 9V-STP
- Flight origin: Sultan Abdul Aziz Shah Airport
- Destination: Changi Airport, Changi, Singapore
- Occupants: 129 (including 4 hijackers)
- Passengers: 118 (including 4 hijackers)
- Crew: 11
- Fatalities: 4 (hijackers)
- Injuries: 2
- Survivors: 125

Singapore Airlines Flight 117 was a regularly-scheduled Singapore Airlines flight from Kuala Lumpur (Sultan Abdul Aziz Shah Airport) to Singapore (Changi Airport). On 26 March 1991 the Airbus A310 serving the flight was hijacked en route by four terrorists. The aircraft landed in Singapore. The hijackers, who were members of the Pakistan People's Party (PPP), demanded the release from jail of former Prime Minister of Pakistan Benazir Bhutto's husband, Asif Ali Zardari, who later became President of Pakistan, as well as other PPP members.

As their demands were not being met, the hijackers threatened to begin killing the hostages; before their deadline expired, commandos from the Special Operations Force (SOF) stormed the plane, killing the hijackers and freeing all hostages unhurt. This was the first and only hijacking involving a Singapore Airlines aircraft.

== Timeline ==
Operation Thunderbolt
Date	27 March 1991
Location	Changi Airport, Singapore
Result	Decisive Special Operations Force victory

Belligerents
(Singapore) Special Operations Force	pro-Pakistan Peoples Party hijackers

Commanders and leaders
Fred Cheong	Shahid Hussein Soomro †

Strength
20 SOF commandos	4 hijackers

Casualties and losses
None	4 killed
- 2 crew wounded

The plane, an Airbus A310 with registration 9V-STP, had taken off from Sultan Abdul Aziz Shah Airport in Subang near Kuala Lumpur, Malaysia at 21:15 SST, with 114 passengers and 11 crew on board. The plane was hijacked in mid-air while en route to Singapore Changi Airport by four Pakistanis. The hijackers were armed with explosives and knives but no firearms. It landed safely at Changi Airport at 22:15, where a group of officials from the Ministry of Defence, Ministry of Home Affairs and Ministry of Information, Communications and the Arts, along with Singapore Airlines representatives and a negotiating team, were waiting.

The hijackers, who claimed to be members of the Pakistan Peoples Party (PPP), demanded the release of former Prime Minister of Pakistan Benazir Bhutto's husband, Asif Ali Zardari (later elected President of Pakistan), as well as other PPP members from jail. The hijackers also required the plane to be refuelled to fly to Australia. The next morning, 27 March, at 02:30, the hijackers pushed two male flight attendants, flight steward Bernard Tan and chief steward Philip Cheong, out of the aircraft, after the plane had been moved to the outer tarmac. Both were the only two injuries reported.

In 2026, ex-diplomat Bilahari Kausikan recalled that he was part of the Singapore government taskforce to deal with the crisis. He attempted to make contact with Benazir Bhutto on behalf of the Singapore government, as the hijackers offered to surrender if they could get in contact with Bhutto. Bhutto was in her estate in Sindh Province. Kausikan spoke to Bhutto's servant over the phone and explained the situation three times, before the servant told Kausikan that "Madam (Bhutto) is sleeping and cannot be disturbed" and proceeded to cut the call the next second.

At 06:45, the hijackers gave a last five-minute deadline, and issued a threat to kill one passenger every ten minutes if their demands were still not met. With three minutes to go, orders were given to initiate the assault: the Singapore Armed Forces Commando Formation (SAF CDO FN) stormed the plane in a 30-second sweep, killing all four hijackers with no injuries to the hostages. The hijack leader had been shot five times in the chest, but was still alive. He then attempted to make a last stand and ignite his explosive but the SOF leader shot him dead before he did so. The plane was completely secured by 06:50.

== Aftermath ==
Singapore received international praise for its prompt action in handling the incident. The Prime Minister of Singapore, Goh Chok Tong, commended all those involved in handling the ordeal and rescue mission for their swiftness and efficiency. Captain Stanley Lim, the pilot of the flight, and Superintendent Foo Kia Juah, chief police negotiator, were awarded the Public Service Star for their roles. The SAF Commando Formation members were awarded the Medal for Valour, and others in the negotiating team were given the President's Certificates of Commendation.

== Aircraft ==
The aircraft involved had been delivered to Singapore Airlines on 22 November 1988. It continued in daily service with Singapore Airlines after the incident for the next ten years, until it was transferred to Spanish airline Air Plus Comet on 11 May 2001. The plane was painted all-white and re-registered as EC-HVB. On 31 May 2003, it was retired from flying and was stored in the Mojave Air and Space Port in the United States. On 25 April 2005, the untitled A310 aircraft which was registered N443RR was broken up and scrapped.

== See also ==
- Air France Flight 8969 – similar incident and resolution in 1994
- Indian Airlines Flight 814 – similar incident in 1999
