= Ee Peng Liang =

Singaporean businessman and philanthropist

Joseph Ee Peng Liang DUNU DUBC PJG BBM KStJ
- Born: 26 November 1913; Kallang, Singapore, Straits Settlements
- Died: 24 August 1994 (aged 80); Katong, Singapore
- Occupations: Businessman and philanthropist
- Known for: Founding member and President of the Singapore Council of Social Service
- Children: 5 (including son Gerard Ee)

Joseph Ee Peng Liang DUNU DUBC PJG BBM KStJ (Chinese: 余炳亮; pinyin: Yú Bǐngliàng; 26 November 1913 – 24 August 1994) was a businessman and a philanthropist. He was the founding member and President of the Singapore Council of Social Service as well as the Community Chest.

Known as the “father of charity” in Singapore, Ee Peng Liang was well known for his charitable nature and voluntary work, for which he received numerous accolades. Ee also held key appointments in over 50 public organisations ranging from Christian welfare agencies, reformative institutions, public welfare bodies, and even women’s and Malay/Muslim associations.

== Early life ==
Ee was born to a poor ethnic Hokkien Peranakan family in 1913 and grew up at the Kallang gasworks area of Singapore in a family of eight siblings. His parents were named Ee Seng Watt and Lim Choon Neo.

== Education ==
Ee was educated at St Joseph’s Institution at the age of nine, and later was qualified as a chartered accountant. In 1947, Ee set up Ee Peng Liang & Co., which started out serving family businesses and grew to serve a sizeable portfolio of clients including public companies. His firm eventually merged with the then Turquand, Youngs & Co. and Ernst & Whinney in 1974 and 1986 respectively, to become part of Ernst & Young.

== Career ==
While working as an accountant, Ee began volunteering at Boys’ Town, of which he was later appointed chairman in 1955. In 1947, he became secretary of the Good Shepherd Sisters’ Marymount Vocational Centre. In 1953, he founded and became vice-president of the Singapore Council for Social Service, and then president in 1958. He has won numerous accolades for his humanitarian work, including the Public Service Star which he received in 1964 and the Meritorious Service Medal which he received in 1967.

== Personal life ==
Ee married Mary Seow in 1936 and had five children. In 1996, his daughter Theresa Ee-Chooi published a memoir about her father, entitled Father of Charity and My Father. His son, Gerard Ee is the current President of National Council of Social Service and has been the CEO of National Kidney Foundation Singapore since 2005.

On 24 August 1994, Ee died of heart failure at his home in Katong, at the age of 81. His funeral was attended by, among others, former President of Singapore Wee Kim Wee, who was also his closest friend, and then Prime Minister Goh Chok Tong.

== Awards and decorations ==
- Order of Nila Utama (Second Class), in 1991.
- Distinguished Service Order, in 1985.
- Meritorious Service Medal, in 1967.
- Public Service Star, in 1963.
