= Pingat Keberanian =

Pingat Keberanian (Medal of Valour)
- Ribbon after 1996
- Type: Medal
- Awarded for: Acts of courage and gallantry
- Presented by: Singapore
- Eligibility: Citizens of Singapore
- Status: Active
- Established: 1987
- Ribbon prior to 1996

Precedence
- Next (higher): Pingat Pentadbiran Awam, Emas
- Next (lower): Pingat Pentadbiran Awam, Perak

The Pingat Keberanian (English: Medal of Valour) is a Singaporean decoration instituted in 1987, awarded to any person who has performed an act of courage and gallantry in circumstances of personal danger.

== History ==
The Pingat Keberanian was instituted in 1987.

== Description ==
- The medal is silver-gilt and consists of an eight-pointed star upon a sixteen-sided base. The obverse side bears a central disc supporting 2 crossed swords and a shield bearing a crescent and 5 stars. Below the disc is a scroll with the description "PINGAT KEBERANIAN".
- The reverse bears the State arms.
- The ribbon is white with a red edging, a purple centre band and a purple stripe to each side of the band.

== Recipients ==
- The commando unit that resolved the hijacking of Singapore Airlines Flight 117
- Heng Yeow Peow, the construction foreman who ordered his colleagues to safety before dying in the Nicoll Highway collapse
- Nine officers of the Singapore Civil Defence Force involved in the search and rescue efforts that followed the Nicoll Highway collapse
