= Pingat Berkebolehan =

Pingat Berkebolehan (Efficiency Medal)
- Ribbon
- Type: Medal
- Awarded for: Exceptional efficiency or exceptional devotion to duty
- Presented by: Singapore
- Eligibility: Any person working in, or associated with, the Singaporean public service
- Status: Active
- Established: 1969
- Ribbon prior to 1996

Precedence
- Next (higher): Pingat Bakti Masyarakat
- Next (lower): Pingat Bakti Setia
- Related: Pingat Berkebolehan (Tentera)

The Pingat Berkebolehan (English: Efficiency Medal) is a Singaporean decoration instituted in 1969. The medal may be awarded to any of the following persons for exceptional efficiency or exceptional devotion to duty or for work of special significance:

- any public officer.
- any officer employed by any statutory authority (other than a Town Council).
- any person in the service of any organisation, association or body rendering services in the field of education.
- any person employed in any company which is wholly owned by the Government and which is carrying on business mainly as an agent or instrumentality of the Government.

The Pingat Berkebolehan (Tentera) is the military equivalent award.

== Description ==
- The medal consists of a ring upon an oblique square in the centre of which is embossed a circular shield bearing a crescent and 5 stars.
- The reverse bears the State Arms and name of the medal.
- The ribbon consists of a red centre band flanked on each side by a red stripe bordered by 2 grey stripes, followed by a red band and a grey band, in that order.
