= Irwan Hambali =

Bruneian police commissioner

Dato Paduka Seri Irwan Hambali DPKT PSPNB DPMB PSB PIKB PKLP
- إروان حنبلي
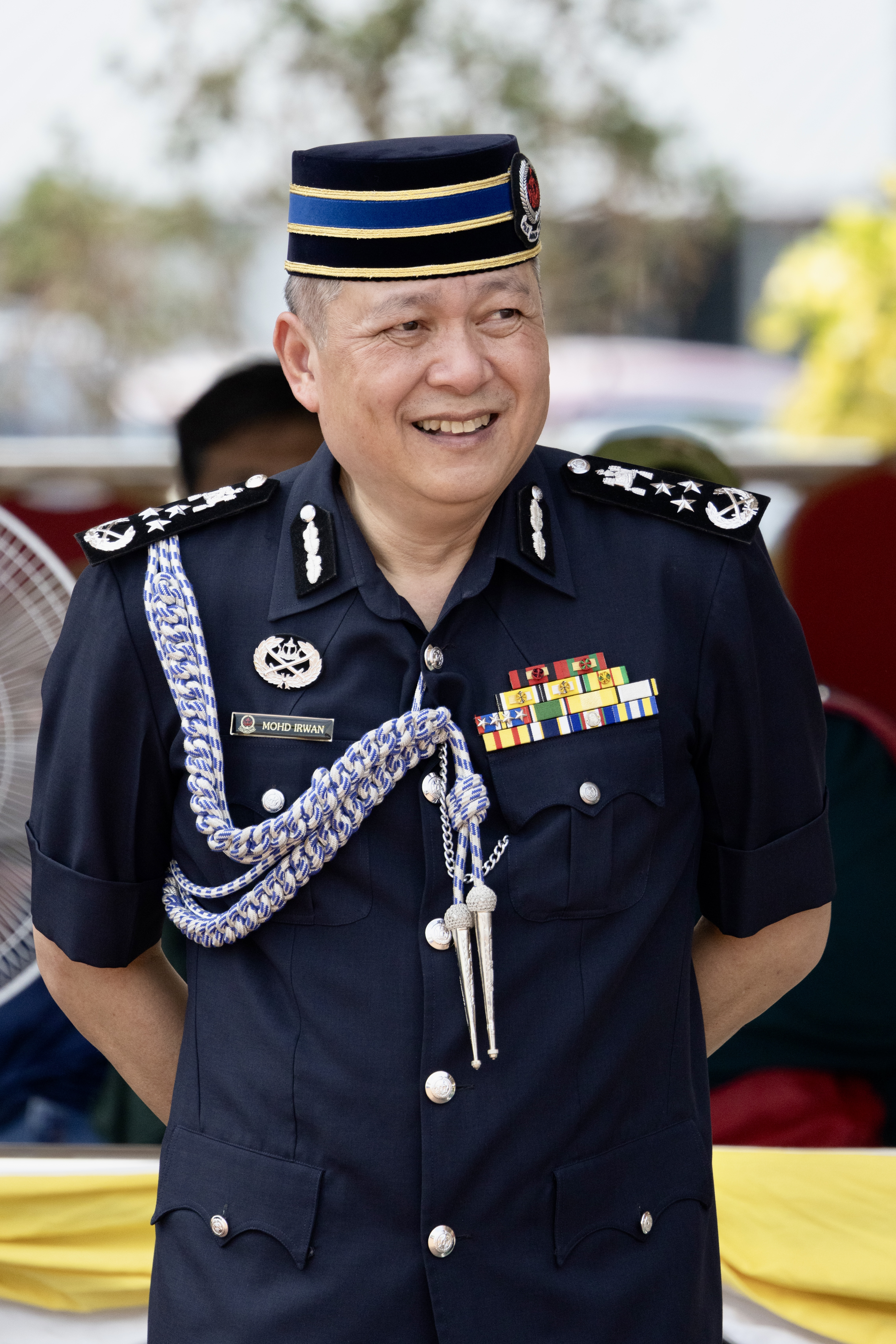
- Irwan in 2024

Commissioner of Police
- In office 22 June 2019 – 15 June 2025
- Monarch: Hassanal Bolkiah
- Deputy: Jefri Abdul Hamid; Sulaiman Alidin
- Preceded by: Jammy Shah Al-Islam
- Succeeded by: Sulaiman Alidin

Personal details
- Born: Brunei
- Education: University of Kent (BSc)
- Police career
- Country: Brunei
- Department: Royal Brunei Police Force
- Service years: 1996–present
- Rank: Commissioner

Mohammad Irwan bin Haji Hambali is a Bruneian police officer who serves as the incumbent police commissioner of the Royal Brunei Police Force (RBPF) since 2019.

== Education ==
Irwan graduated from the University of Kent with a Bachelor of Science (BSc) in human resource management and a Bachelor of Engineering (BEng) in chemical engineering. During his time in law enforcement, he has attended several courses in Brunei, Malaysia, Thailand and Singapore.

== Career ==
Irwan enlisted in the police force on 1 July 1995. He became an officer on 8 August 1996 and has since climbed the ranks from being the assistant superintendent on 1 August 1998; acting deputy superintendent on 1 January 2001; deputy superintendent on 1 July 2001; acting superintendent on 1 June 2006; superintendent on 1 January 2008; acting senior superintendent on 24 October 2009; and assistant commissioner on 10 May 2012.

Irwan's first posting was the Kuala Belait police station in 1996. He then began working as a traffic investigator at the Jerudong police station on 1 January 1997. On 23 April 2001, he was appointed assistant head of the Jerudong police station and also served as a criminal investigation officer. On 1 September 2001, he was assigned as the head of the Traffic Control and Investigation Department. On 1 July 2005, he was moved to the Logistics Department, and on 1 September 2006, he was appointed head of the Training Unit in the General Administration and Finance Department.

On 22 December 2013, the RBPF signed a contract with TelBru for the design, implementation, and maintenance of the National Digital Communication System, with Irwan representing the Government of Brunei. Another significant occasion in the history of the ASEAN Chiefs of Police (ASEANAPOL) Secretariat occurred on 27 August 2019, when Irwan, the chairman, and Abdul Hamid Bador, the Inspector General of the Royal Malaysia Police (RMP), paid an official visit to the secretariat's office. He would also attend the 39th ASEANAPOL conference in Hanoi.

The police headquarters in Gadong held a ceremony to officially hand over the reins as police commissioner. On 4 March 2021, Jammy Shah Al-Islam signed the letter transferring responsibility to Irwan after successfully completing his service term. At a media conference held at the police headquarters, he highlighted that the administration takes the directive prohibiting social isolation and holding any sort of group activity seriously amid the government's attempt in containing the COVID-19 pandemic.

During President Jokowi's visit to the country on 13 January 2024, Irwan was among the first officials to welcome him. Later on 23 March, he presented the donations given to about 55 RBPF orphans during a ceremony held in the banquet hall of the police headquarters. On 15 June 2025, the Borneo Bulletin announced that he would be relieved of his post and succeeded by Sulaiman Alidin, who would serve as the acting police commissioner.

== Personal life ==
Irwan is married to Pengiran Datin Hajah Zauyah binti Pengiran Haji Sulaiman.

== Honours ==
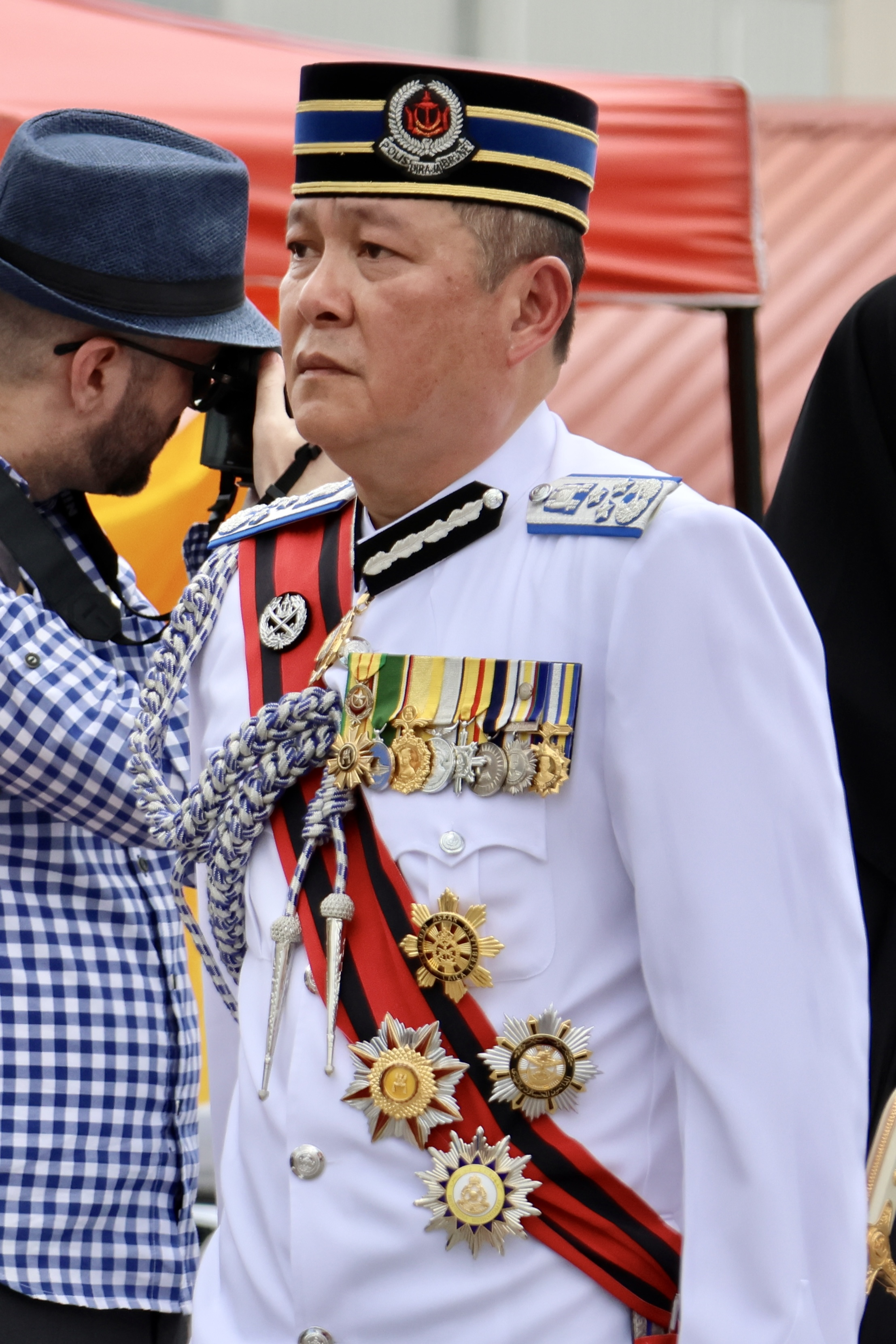
Irwan wearing his sash and state honours in 2024

Irwan has earned the following honours:

National

- Order of Paduka Keberanian Laila Terbilang First Class (DPKT; 15 July 2019) – Dato Paduka Seri
- Order of Pahlawan Negara Brunei First Class (PSPNB; 15 July 2018) – Dato Seri Pahlawan
- Order of Seri Paduka Mahkota Brunei Second Class (DPMB; 15 July 2017) – Dato Paduka
- Order of Setia Negara Brunei Fourth Class (PSB; August 2012)
- Excellent Service Medal (PIKB; February 2006)
- Police Long Service Medal (PKLP)
- Sultan of Brunei Golden Jubilee Medal (5 October 2017)
- National Day Silver Jubilee Medal (23 February 2009)
- General Service Medal (Police)
- Police 75 Years Medal (1996)
- Police 100 Years Medal (2021)

Foreign

- Malaysia:
  - Courageous Commander of the Most Gallant Police Order (PGPP; 31 October 2023)
- Singapore :
  - Recipient of the Darjah Utama Bakti Cemerlang (DUBC; 21 October 2024)

Police appointments
Preceded by Jammy Shah Al-Islam	Commissioner of Police	Succeeded by Sulaiman Alidin
