= Kirtida Mekani =

Environmental sustainability and arts advocate in Singapore

Kirtida Mekani (1959 - 2026) was a businesswoman and advocate for environmental sustainability, community service and cultural heritage in Singapore

== Life and career ==
Kirtida Mekani was born to a farming family in Karnataka, India in 1959. In 1990 she moved to Singapore with her husband Bharat Mekani. They ran a family business together but she became increasingly involved with environmental education, mentoring young leaders, and advising organisations.

She led or supported many organisations, all with aims to increase Singapore's environmental sustainability, restore natural plant species to the city and inspire the community, especially young people, to be involved. In 1993 she founded and for its first 4 years was executive director of the Singapore Environmental Council. In 2007 she led the Singapore Plant-a Tree Programme in partnership with the National Parks Board and Garden City Fund, resulting in members of the public planting over 75,000 trees for around 200 native species in land owned by the National Parks Board. In 2016, she co-founded the Biomimicry Singapore Network, bringing scientists, citizens and business people together to explore nature-inspired innovation. She was also a member of the Garden City Fund Management Committee. She was a board member of Botanic Gardens Conservation International from 2021 until 2026.

Mekani was also a ceramic artist and supported many arts organisations, including being a committee member of the Singapore Indian Fine Arts Society.

She died suddenly on 19 January 2026 aged 66.

In 2015 she received the President's Award for the Environment in Singapore. in 2024 she was inducted into the Singapore Women's Hall of Fame as 'Champion of the Environment'.
