= Tjong Yik Min =

Singaporean civil servant (1952–2019)

Tjong Yik Min PPA(E) PBM
- Tjong in 1994

Chairman of the Civil Aviation Authority of Singapore
- In office 1 September 1999 – 31 August 2005
- Preceded by: Sim Kee Boon
- Succeeded by: Liew Mun Leong

Chairman of the Telecommunication Authority of Singapore
- In office 1 April 1994 – 1 November 1995
- Preceded by: Tan Guong Ching
- Succeeded by: Teo Ming Kian

Director of the Internal Security Department
- In office 1 May 1986 – 1 March 1993
- Preceded by: Eddie Teo
- Succeeded by: Chiang Chie Foo

Personal details
- Born: November 1952
- Died: 31 May 2019 (aged 66) Singapore
- Education: University of Singapore (MSc, BEc); University of Newcastle (BSc, BCom); National Junior College

Chinese name
- Traditional Chinese: 張奕民
- Simplified Chinese: 张奕民
Transcriptions
Standard Mandarin
- Hanyu Pinyin: Zhāng Yìmín
- IPA: [ʈʂáŋ.î.mǐn]

Tjong Yik Min (Note: Chinese: see Chinese name and romanisation) PPA(E) PBM (November 1952 – 31 May 2019) was a Singaporean public servant, who served as director of the Internal Security Department from 1986 to 1993. He was once described by Prime Minister Lee Kuan Yew as one of the most ablest directors.

Tjong retired from the public service in 1995, and joined Singapore Press Holdings and later Yeo Hiap Seng.

Tjong was married, and died from pneumonia in 2019.

== Early life and education ==
In November 1952, Tjong was born. He was the youngest, and had two older sisters. Tjong received his education at Catholic High School and National Junior College.

Tjong was a President's Scholar, and he was also awarded a Colombo Plan scholarship. Tjong obtained a Bachelor of Commerce in economics and a Bachelor of Science in industrial engineering from the University of Newcastle. Later, he attended the University of Singapore. Tjong graduated with a Bachelor of Economics and a Master of Science in industrial engineering.

== Career ==
From 1976 to 1979, Tjong worked in the Ministry of Defence, and the Security and Intelligence Division. In August 1979, he was transferred to the Internal Security Department (ISD). In 1984, Tjong was promoted to deputy director of the department.

On 1 May 1986, Tjong succeeded Eddie Teo as director of ISD. Tjong was the first bilingual ISD director. In May 1988, during a parliamentary debate of the Internal Security Act, Prime Minister Lee Kuan Yew said that Tjong was not a Gestapo chief and "is amongst the ablest of the 11 directors of Special Branch and ISD".

On 1 March 1993, Tjong was appointed as permanent secretary in the Ministry of Communications, succeeding Tan Guong Ching, and Chiang Chie Foo became director of ISD. In April 1993, he was appointed as a director of Singapore Shipbuilding and Engineering.

On 1 February 1994, Tjong was appointed as a director of Singapore Press Holdings (SPH). On 1 April 1994, he succeeded Tan as chairman of the Telecommunication Authority of Singapore (TAS).

On 1 November 1995, Tjong was appointed as executive director of SPH and retired from the public service. He was succeeded by Teo Ming Kian as permanent secretary of the ministry and chairman of TAS. On 1 April 1996, Tjong was appointed as a board member of the Civil Service College. On 1 June 1996, he was appointed as a director of Singapore Airlines.

On 1 September 1999, Tjong was appointed as chairman of the Civil Aviation Authority of Singapore (CAAS), succeeding Sim Kee Boon. In October 2001, as group president of SPH, he announced the delisting of AsiaOne from the Singapore Exchange, following consecutive losses. On 1 July 2002, Tjong was succeeded by Alan Chan as group president of SPH, appointed as president and chief operating officer of Yeo Hiap Seng (YHS), and appointed as a director of Far East Organisation.

On 31 August 2005, Tjong stepped down as chairman of CAAS, and he was succeeded by Liew Mun Leong. In September 2005, he was appointed as a director of Genting Singapore, after the company applied to be listed on the Singapore Exchange. In 2009, Tjong exercised his share options, increasing his stake in the company from 400,000 shares to 613,000 shares.

In April 2010, Tjong became the chief executive officer of YHS. He retired in April 2015.

== Personal life ==
In 2018, Tjong began experiencing cardiac issues, and was diagnosed with pancreatic cancer in November. In May 2019, he experienced two cardiac arrests, and he was hospitalised to undergo coronary artery bypass surgery. On 31 May 2019, at 21:00 Singapore Time (UTC+08:00), Tjong died from pneumonia.

== Awards and decorations ==
- Public Service Medal, in 2005.
- Public Administration Medal (Gold), in 1988.
