= Pingat Berkebolehan (Tentera) =

Singapore Armed Forces award

Pingat Berkebolehan (Tentera) (Efficiency Medal (Military))
- Ribbon
- Type: Medal
- Awarded for: Commendable achievements in military command or staff work, or service over and above the call of duty
- Presented by: Singapore
- Eligibility: Members of the Singapore Armed Forces
- Status: Active
- Established: 1981

Precedence
- Next (higher): Pingat Penghargaan (Tentera)
- Next (lower): Singapore Armed Forces Overseas Service Medal
- Related: Pingat Berkebolehan

The Pingat Berkebolehan (Tentera) (English: Efficiency Medal (Military)) is a decoration awarded to any member of the Singapore Armed Forces who has clearly demonstrated exceptional efficiency, devotion to duty, or produced work of special significance. The candidate is also one who has shown initiative, thoroughness, and resourcefulness in their work.

The Pingat Berkebolehan is the civil equivalent award.

== Description ==
- The ribbon is purple with a white central stripe and white edges.
