= Pingat Gagah Perkasa =

Civil Award in Singapore

Pingat Gagah Perkasa (Conspicuous Gallantry Medal)
- Type: Medal
- Established: 19 April 1962; 64 years ago
- Country: Singapore
- Awarded for: An act of conspicuous gallantry and courage performed in Singapore
- Status: Active

Precedence
- Next (higher): Pingat Kehormatan
- Next (lower): Pingat Jasa Gemilang
- Equivalent: Pingat Gagah Perkasa (Tentera)
- Ribbon after 1996 Ribbon prior to 1996

The Pingat Gagah Perkasa (English: Conspicuous Gallantry Medal) is a medal instituted in 1962. It is awarded to any person in Singapore that has performed "an act of conspicuous gallantry and courage in circumstances of extreme personal danger". It may also be awarded to any person who has performed an act outside Singapore in special circumstances.

The military equivalent of the award is the Pingat Gagah Perkasa (Tentera), which is given to members of the Singapore Armed Forces.

== History ==
The Pingat Gagah Perkasa was instituted on 19 April 1962. It was one of six state awards to be given out by Yusof Ishak, the then President of Singapore, during the 1962 Singapore National Day Honours. The rules of the award were revised in July 1996.

== Description ==
- The ribbon is white with 2 purple stripes and a narrower purple stripe in the centre followed by a red stripe to each side.

== Recipients ==
Year	Recipient	Affiliation	For	Ref.
1962	DSP Ong Kian Tiong	Singapore Police Force	Capture of kidnapper Oh Kim Kee	
1962	DSP V. N. Ratna Singam	Singapore Police Force	Capture of kidnapper Oh Kim Kee	
1966	DSP T. E. Ricketts	Singapore Police Force	Killing of kidnapper Teo Kee Lai	
1966	SGT Paramasivam S/O Doraisamy	Singapore Police Force	Killing of kidnapper Teo Kee Lai	
