= Liew Mun Leong =

Singaporean civil engineer and businessman (born 1946)

Liew Mun Leong PJG PPA(G)

Chairman of the Civil Aviation Authority of Singapore
- In office 1 September 2005 – 30 July 2009
- Preceded by: Tjong Yik Min
- Succeeded by: Lee Hsien Yang

Personal details
- Born: June 1946 (age 80)
- Spouse: Ng Lai Peng
- Children: 3
- Education: University of Singapore (BEng)

Chinese name
- Traditional Chinese: 廖文良
- Simplified Chinese: 廖文良
Transcriptions
Standard Mandarin
- Hanyu Pinyin: Liào Wénliáng
- IPA: [liâʊ.wə̌n.liǎŋ]

Liew Mun Leong (Note: Chinese: see Chinese name and romanisation) PJG PPA(G) (born June 1946) is a Singaporean civil engineer and businessman, who served as chairman of the Civil Aviation Authority of Singapore from 2005 to 2009.

== Education ==
Liew received his early education at Queenstown Secondary School. He later attended the University of Singapore, and graduated in 1970 with a Bachelor of Engineering in civil engineering.

== Career ==
=== Civil career ===
In 1970, Liew began his career in the Ministry of Defence, working on the development of military camps. In 1974, he joined Public Works Department (PWD) as an engineer and worked on the development of Changi Airport. He was later promoted to become the chief airport project manager of Terminal 2. In October 1986, after the collapse of Hotel New World, Liew said that all government buildings were checked every five years, and recommended that all private buildings also be checked regularly.

In January 1987, Liew was appointed as a registrar of the Professional Engineers' Board. In June 1988, he was appointed as the general manager of the Singapore Institute of Standards and Industrial Research (SISIR), and later, chief executive. In September 1988, Liew announced that SISIR would inspect electronic components for IBM, through its S$3 million Electronics Test Centre at Singapore Science Park, and said that one of his priorities was for SISIR to become self-sustaining by being "more market driven".

In January 1989, Liew signed a memorandum of understanding with Khoo Kay Chai, principal of Singapore Polytechnic (SP), for SISIR and SP to work on joint projects, such as seminars, courses, and staff secondment. In July 1989, Liew reminded local manufacturers to adhere with international quality standards, such as the International Organisation for Standardization (ISO), to export their products overseas much easier. In September 1989, he announced that SISIR was expected to be self-sustaining in the next financial year, two years earlier than expected.

In January 1991, Liew represented Singapore on the ISO executive board. In February 1991, he said that companies may need to adhere to ISO 9000 family standards if they want to continue their exports to the European Economic Community. In May 1992, Liew was appointed as an executive director of the National Science and Technology Board (NSTB). In August 1992, he also said that ISO standards should be adopted by the service industry to improve their quality of service. In November 1992, Liew left the public service to join L&M Group Investments Ltd., (Note: An investments holding company, focussing on construction and engineering. Previously listed on the Singapore Exchange with ticker L13.) as the group managing director. As such, Khoo Lee Meng took over as chief executive of SISIR, and Leong Wai Leng became executive director of NSTB.

=== Post-civil career ===
In June 1993, Liew was part of a 26-man council, known as the Shandong–Singapore Business Council. (Note: The council was chaired by Tang Guan Seng.)

In September 1995, Liew was elected president of ISO, succeeding Eberhard Molimann. He was the first Singaporean and fourth Asian to be elected as president. Speaking at a press conference, Liew said that he would "harmonise" standardisation efforts in the region with the West, to improve ease of trade.

On 17 April 1996, he resigned from L&M Group, and joined ST Properties, the real estate development arm of Singapore Technologies. In June 1996, Liew announced that ST Properties acquired Pidemco Land, but declined to state the purchase price. He was appointed as chief executive of Pidemco Land, and said that it would take about three months to review a new business plan to align with ST Properties. In September 1996, after signing a joint venture agreement with MRCB, Liew said that he felt "positive about the Malaysian property market", and Pidemco Land was interested in developing more residential projects with MRCB.

Liew was appointed as a board member of PSB and Liang Court, on 1 April 1999 and May 1999 respectively. Following the resignation of seven directors, Liew was appointed as deputy chairman of Liang Court.

In July 2000, the merger of DBS Land and Pidemco Land created CapitaLand, and Liew was appointed as its president and chief executive officer. In 2001, Liew was one of the highest paid chief executive officers in Singapore, earning a total of S$2,200,000. (Note: S$1,500,000 in salary and bonus, and S$727,000 in fair value stock options.) In 2006, he was paid S$5,140,000, making him the 5th-highest paid executive locally. In 2007, Liew was awarded S$20,520,000 in bonuses, assumed to be "the largest bonus ever awarded" in a single year to an executive. CapitaLand clarified that the figure was derived primarily by an economic value added bonus payment. He stepped down on 1 January 2013, and he was succeeded by Lim Ming Yan.

On 1 September 2005, Liew succeeded Tjong Yik Min as chairman of the Civil Aviation Authority of Singapore. He stepped down on 30 June 2009, and became chairman of Changi Airport Group (CAG).

In June 2015, Liew was appointed as chairman of Surbana Jurong (SJ). In September 2020, following the acquittal of the family's former domestic helper, Liew resigned as chairman of CAG and SJ, together with other positions in Temasek Holdings and Temasek Foundation.

=== Academia ===
On 15 April 2013, Liew was appointed as a professor at the business school and the engineering faculty of the National University of Singapore. He taught graduate and undergraduate courses, related to leadership and management, on a pro bono and part-time arrangement.

== Personal life ==
Liew is married to Ng Lai Peng, and they have three children. His son, Karl Liew Kai Lung, was sentenced to two weeks' imprisonment in 2023 for lying to court that the family's domestic helper, Parti Liyani, had stolen his clothing; Liyani had been acquitted in 2020 of said theft.

Liew is interested in Chinese opera, and was the chairman of the Chinese Opera Institute. In 2004, during the discussion of developing integrated resorts in Singapore, Liew was supportive of opening a casino.

On 22 November 2015, Liew was on board Singapore Airlines Flight 001, where a false bomb threat was made.

== Awards and decorations ==
=== National honours ===
- Meritorious Service Medal, in 2011.
- Public Administration Medal (Bronze), in 1979.

=== Foreign honours ===
- Legion of Honour (Knight), on 12 September 2017.

=== Awards ===
In October 1998, Liew was awarded the Distinguished Service Award by Ho Ching, deputy chairwoman of the Productivity and Standards Board (PSB), for his contributions to international standards and improving Singapore's image.

Liew was also awarded a Distinguished Engineering Alumni Award by the National University of Singapore.

== Publications ==
- 廖, 文良 (2008). 陈, 美玲 (ed.). 建宇树人: 总裁周日随想录 [Building People: Sunday Emails from a CEO] (in Simplified Chinese). Vol. 1. Translated by 林, 凤英; 林, 琬绯. Singapore: 八方文化创作室. ISBN 9789814139953. OCLC 406975147.
- Liew, Mun Leong (15 January 2008). Building People: Sunday Emails from a CEO. Vol. 1. Singapore: Wiley. ISBN 9780470822906. OCLC 758974079.
- 廖, 文良 (2011). 建宇树人: 总裁周日随想录 [Building People: Sunday Emails from a CEO] (in Simplified Chinese). Vol. 2. Translated by 陈, 美玲; 林, 琬绯. Singapore: Wiley. ISBN 9780470829851. OCLC 1341375085.
- Liew, Mun Leong (7 January 2011). Building People: Sunday Emails from a CEO. Vol. 2. Singapore: Wiley. ISBN 9780470827864. OCLC 940753590.
- 廖, 文良 (2013). 建宇树人: 总裁周日随想录 [Building People: Sunday Emails from a CEO] (in Simplified Chinese). Vol. 3. Translated by 陈, 美玲; 郑, 诗慧; 林, 晓琪; 白, 晶晶. Singapore: Wiley. ISBN 9781118469446. OCLC 1341382945.
- Liew, Mun Leong (17 June 2013). Building People: Sunday Emails from a CEO. Vol. 3. Singapore: Wiley. ISBN 9781118469422. OCLC 841672348.
- Liew, Mun Leong (20 September 2016). Building People: Sunday Emails from a CEO. Vol. 4. Singapore: Wiley. ISBN 9781119288060. OCLC 960038710.
- 廖, 文良 (2019). 主席周日随想录 [Building People: Sunday Emails from a CEO] (in Simplified Chinese). Vol. 5. Singapore: Straits Times Press. ISBN 9789814827133. OCLC 1089442853.
- Liew, Mun Leong (December 2018). Sunday Emails from a CEO. Vol. 5. Singapore: Straits Times Press. ISBN 9789814827102. OCLC 1057465646.
- Liew, Mun Leong (August 2025). Barracks to Boardroom: Climbing The Greasy Pole. Singapore: Straits Times Press. ISBN 9789815081244. OCLC 1543329036.
