= Cheong Choong Kong =

Malaysian businessman

- 张松光
- Born: 9 June 1941 (age 85); Malaysia
- Education: University of Adelaide, Australian National University
- Occupations: Chairman, OCBC

Cheong Choong Kong (simplified Chinese: 张松光; traditional Chinese: 張松光; pinyin: Zhāng Sōng Guāng; Jyutping: Zoeng1 Cung4 Gwong1; Pe̍h-ōe-jī: Tiuⁿ Siông-kong; born 9 June 1941) is a Malaysian businessman and former chief executive officer of Singapore Airlines. After the collision of Singapore Airlines Flight 006 during take-off, he appeared as the public face of the airline. He is currently the chairman of the Oversea-Chinese Banking Corporation and has recently had a cameo appearance on MediaCorp TV Channel 5 television sitcom The Yang Sisters as San Poh.

== Education ==
After completing his studies at the Methodist Boys' School in Kuala Lumpur, Malaysia, Cheong obtained a Bachelor of Science with First Class Honours in Mathematics from the University of Adelaide in 1964. He studied in Australia as a Colombo Plan scholar.

He also received a Master of Science (1966) and a Ph.D. (1968) in Mathematics from Australian National University. His main fields of study were random processes and related areas of applied and theoretical probability.

== Career ==
He began his career as a mathematics lecturer in the University of Malaya (1968), eventually becoming associate professor and serving as head of the department.

He left academics in 1974 to work with Singapore Airlines. He spent 29 years at Singapore Airlines; he eventually became the company's CEO.

In 1998, Fortune named him Asian Businessman of the Year, noting that SIA had an "unbroken 27-year record of profitability through turbulent economic times."

He was first appointed to the board of OCBC on 1 July 1999. He served as vice chairman from 26 March 2002 to 30 June 2003. On 1 July 2003, he was elected chairman of the board.

He is now a Director of several companies, including Singapore Press Holdings Ltd, Great Eastern Holdings Ltd, Great Eastern Life Assurance Company Ltd and Overseas Assurance Corporation Ltd.

On August 31, 2014, Kong retired as the chairman of OCBC Bank veterans board of directors.

In February 2018, BRIEF-Frasers Centrepoint Trust announced the appointment of Kong as the new chairman.

== Affiliations ==
He served as Chairman of the Singapore Broadcasting Corporation and of its successor, Singapore International Media from July 1989 to September 1995. He has also served as the Chairman of the Council of the National University of Singapore. His service was for two consecutive two-year terms ending on July 31, 2004. He has served as vice-chairman of the Singapore-US Business Council. Finally, Cheong has held directorships in companies which include Singapore Press Holdings Ltd, Great Eastern Holdings Ltd and United Eagle Airlines Co Ltd.

== Bibliography ==
- Berger, Nancy and Michael Marquardt (2000). Global Leaders in the Twenty-first Century. Albany: State University of New York Press.
- Singh, Kulwant et al. (2004). Business Strategy in Asia: A Casebook. Singapore: Thomson.
- Tjosvold, Dean and Kwok Leung (2004). Leading in High-Growth Asia. Singapore: World Scientific.
