= Tan Gee Paw =

Singaporean former bureaucrat (born c. 1944)

Tan Gee Paw DUNU DUBC PJG
- 陈义辅
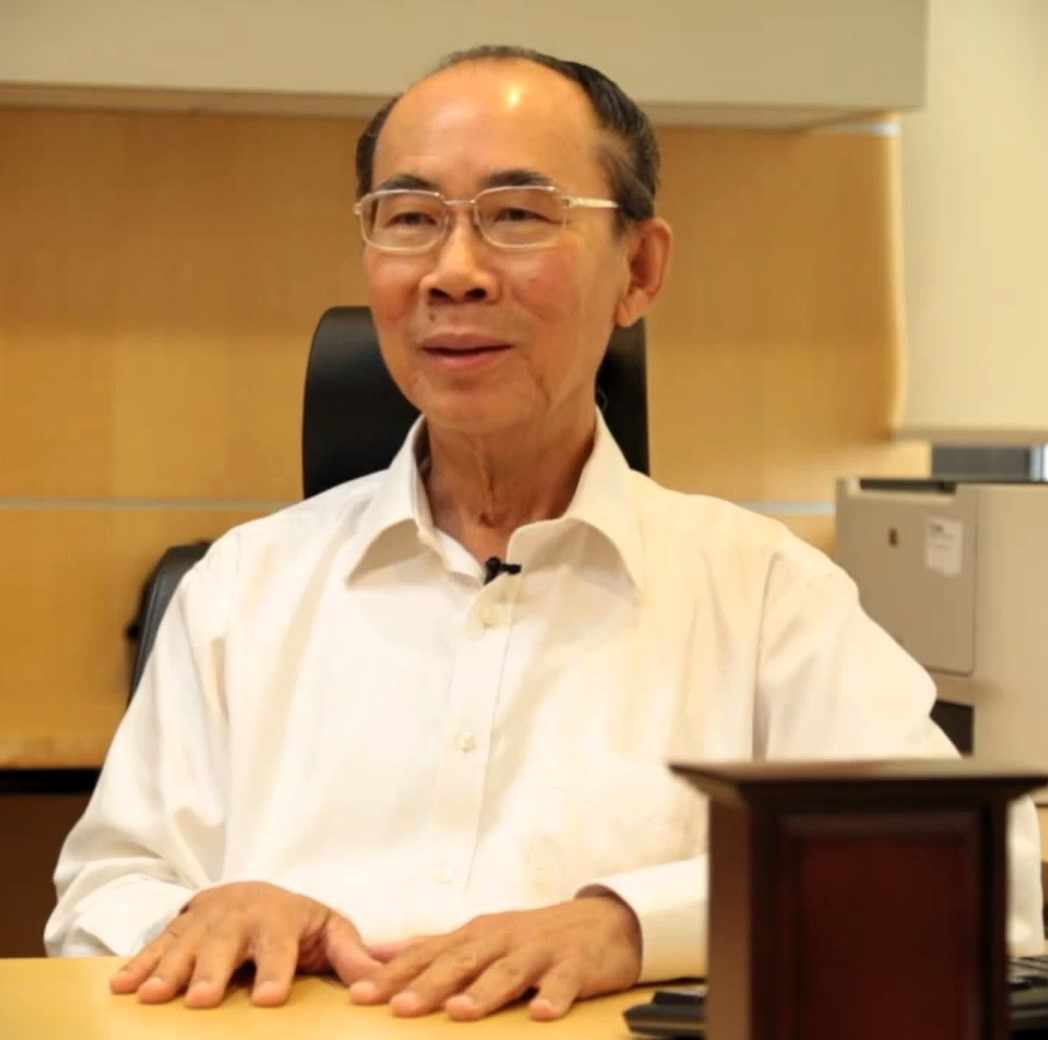
- Tan in 2015

Chairman of the Public Utilities Board
- In office 1 April 2001 – 31 March 2017
- Prime Minister: Goh Chok Tong; Lee Hsien Loong
- Preceded by: Lee Ek Tieng
- Succeeded by: Chiang Chie Foo

Personal details
- Education: University of Malaya (BS)

Chinese name
- Simplified Chinese: 陈义辅
- Traditional Chinese: 陳義輔
Transcriptions
Standard Mandarin
- Hanyu Pinyin: Chén Yìfǔ

Tan Gee Paw DUNU DUBC PJG (born c. 1944) is a Singaporean former bureaucrat who served as chairman of the Public Utilities Board from 2001 to 2017. He was also chairman of Changi Airport Group from 2020 to 2025.

== Early life and education ==
Tan was born sometime during the Japanese occupation of Malaya in 1944. His father was a clerk. Tan grew up with numerous extended relatives in a bungalow in Waterloo Street and attended Anglo-Chinese School.

After the war, Tan was offered a Colombo Plan scholarship to study marine engineering, but he declined it after "picturing myself as a marine engineer on board a ship" and deciding that "I don't think I want to spend my life inside those ships." He successfully applied for a Public Service Commission bursary to read civil engineering instead at the University of Malaya. Despite suffering from a slipped disc in his final year, Tan graduated with first-class honours in 1967.

== Career ==
Tan's career in public service began in the late 1960s when he joined the Public Works Department as a junior engineer. Shortly after establishing the Water Planning Unit in the Prime Minister's Office in 1971, Prime Minister Lee Kuan Yew tasked Tan and the Permanent Secretary of the Ministry of the Environment, Lee Ek Tieng, with drafting Singapore's first water master plan.

In 1974, Tan joined the Ministry of the Environment's environmental engineering division. As head of the Drainage Department, Tan formulated a five-year drainage improvement proposal with Lee Ek Tieng. The Cabinet of Singapore quickly approved of their S$100 million programme, which led to a significance decrease in the incidence of floods nationwide.

On 27 February 1977, Prime Minister Lee Kuan Yew challenged the Ministry of the Environment to clean up Singapore's waterways—including the Singapore River and the rivers in the Kallang Basin—within ten years. Tan joined a task force led by Lee Ek Tieng and was tasked with drafting a master plan that would identify the various sources of water pollution. The eventual operation was regarded as a success by Lee Kuan Yew. Tan, Lee Ek Tieng, and eight other civil servants who were involved in the cleanup were each presented with a solid gold medal at a Clean River Commemoration ceremony on 2 September 1987.

In October 1989, Tan replaced Chen Hung as principal of Ngee Ann Polytechnic. Tan relinquished his position in March 1995 to succeed Tan Guong Ching as Permanent Secretary of the Ministry of the Environment. On 1 April 2001, Tan became chairman of the Public Utilities Board (PUB). In 2015, he was awarded the President's Science and Technology Medal—the highest scientific honour in Singapore—for "his pivotal role in harnessing science and technology to enable Singapore to achieve sustainable water supply." On 31 March 2017, Tan announced his resignation as PUB chairman. He was succeeded the next day by Chiang Chie Foo.

In October 2020, Tan succeeded Liew Mun Leong as chairman of Changi Airport Group. Tan was succeeded by Lim Ming Yan on 1 April 2025.

== Awards and honours ==
=== National awards ===
- Pingat Jasa Gemilang (2001)
- President's Award for the Environment (2007)
- Darjah Utama Bakti Cemerlang (2010)
- President's Science and Technology Medal (2015)
- Darjah Utama Nila Utama (2025)

=== Organisational awards ===
- The Institution of Engineers, Singapore's Lifetime Achievement Award (2015)
- Distinguished Professional Engineer Award (2017)

=== Honorary degrees ===
- University of Westminster — Doctor of Science

=== Other ===
- Asian Scientist 100, Asian Scientist, 2016
