= Orders, decorations, and medals of Singapore =

Awards in Singapore

Orders, decorations and medals conferred upon civilians and military personnel in Singapore are listed according to their order of precedence. Awards that are specific to the military or police forces are listed separately. All state orders and decorations are formally styled in the Malay language, the symbolic national language of Singapore.

== History ==
Singapore's national awards were first instituted in 1962. At the time, there were six awards: the Darjah Utama Temasek (Order of Temasek), Sijil Kemuliaan (Certificate of Honour), Pingat Gagah Perkasa (Conspicuous Gallantry Medal), Pingat Bakti Cemerlang (Distinguished Service Medal), Pingat Jasa Gemilang (Meritorious Service Medal) and Pingat Bakti Setia (Long Service Award).

The Pingat Pentadbiran Awam (Public Administration Medal) was introduced in 1963 with three levels, Gangsa, Perak and Emas (Bronze, Silver and Gold respectively). A military equivalent of this medal was created in 1981. The Pingat Bakti Masyarakat (Public Service Medal) was also instituted in 1963. In 1987, Pingat Keberanian (Medal of Valour) was established.

== Nominations and awards ==
Candidates are nominated every March or April and two different committees recommends the candidates for the various awards. Recommendations are submitted to the Cabinet of Singapore for approval and then the President of Singapore will confer the awards to the recipients. Military awards are considered by the Armed Forces Council and also submitted to the Cabinet for approval. The recipients are announced on 9 August, Singapore's National Day, and then given during investiture in November.

== Orders and decorations ==
Note that the ribbons shown are those used after 1996. For pre-1996 ribbons, see the appropriate award page.

- Bintang Temasek (Star of Temasek) – BT
- Darjah Utama Temasek (Order of Temasek) – DUT
- Darjah Utama Nila Utama (Order of Nila Utama) – DUNU
- Sijil Kemuliaan (Certificate of Honour)
- Darjah Utama Bakti Cemerlang (Distinguished Service Order) – DUBC
- Pingat Kehormatan (Medal of Honour)
- Pingat Gagah Perkasa (Conspicuous Gallantry Medal)
- Pingat Jasa Gemilang (Meritorious Service Medal) – PJG
- Bintang Bakti Masyarakat (Public Service Star) – BBM
- Pingat Pentadbiran Awam, Emas (Public Administration Medal, Gold) – PPA(E)
- Pingat Keberanian (Medal of Valour)
- Pingat Pentadbiran Awam, Perak (Public Administration Medal, Silver) – PPA(P)
- Pingat Pentadbiran Awam, Gangsa (Public Administration Medal, Bronze) – PPA(G)
- Pingat Kepujian (Commendation Medal) – PK
- Pingat Bakti Masyarakat (Public Service Medal) – PBM
- Pingat Berkebolehan (Efficiency Medal) – PB
- Pingat Bakti Setia (Long Service Award) – PBS
- COVID-19 Resilience Medal (CRM)

Several state awards such as the Commendation Medal, the Public Service Medal and the Public Administration Medal awarded for a person's contributions to Singapore's fight against the COVID-19 pandemic have the words "(COVID-19)" added at the end of the designation and style of the Medal. They all share the same ribbon as the COVID-19 Resilience Medal (CRM). These state awards (in order of precedence) are:

- Pingat Jasa Gemilang (COVID-19) – Meritorious Service Medal (COVID-19)
- Bintang Bakti Masyarakat (COVID-19) – Public Service Star (COVID-19)
- Pingat Pentadbiran Awam (Emas) (COVID-19) – Public Administration Medal (Gold) (COVID-19)
- Pingat Keberanian (COVID-19) – Medal of Valour (COVID-19)
- Pingat Pentadbiran Awam (Perak) (COVID-19) – Public Administration Medal (Silver) (COVID-19)
- Pingat Pentadbiran Awam (Gangsa) (COVID-19) – Public Administration Medal (Bronze) (COVID-19)
- Pingat Kepujian (COVID-19) – Commendation Medal (COVID-19)
- Pingat Bakti Masyarakat (COVID-19) – Public Service Medal (COVID-19)
- Sijil Kepujian Presiden (COVID-19) – President’s Certificate of Commendation (COVID-19)

== See also ==
- List of prizes, medals, and awards in Singapore
