= Lim Pin =

Singaporean academic

Lim Pin DUBC

Vice Chancellor of National University of Singapore
- In office 1981–2000

Personal details
- Born: 12 January 1936 (age 90) Singapore
- Education: Queens' College, University of Cambridge; St Thomas's Hospital Medical School, London; Raffles Institution, Singapore
- Profession: Professor of Medicine
- Website: Office of the President

Professor Lim Pin DUBC (born 12 January 1936) was the Vice Chancellor at the National University of Singapore (NUS) from 1981 to 2000. Professor Lim began his career at the University of Singapore in 1966 as lecturer and was later promoted to Professor, heading the Department of Medicine. He served as the Deputy Vice-Chancellor from 1979 to 1981 and the Vice Chancellor from 1981 to 2000. In 2000, he was named the first University Professor of NUS.

Professor Lim is currently University Professor at the Yong Loo Lin School of Medicine, NUS as well as Professor Emeritus and Senior Consultant at the Department of Endocrinology at the National University Hospital.

Academic offices
Preceded by Tony Tan Keng Yam	Vice Chancellor of the National University of Singapore; 1981-2000	Succeeded by Shih Choon Fong as President
