= Peter Ho (chairman) =

Singaporean senior civil servant

Peter Ho Hak Ean DUNU DUBC PJG PPA(E) PPA(P) PBS
- Born: 1955 (age 70–71); Colony of Singapore
- Allegiance: Singapore
- Branch: Republic of Singapore Navy
- Rank: Colonel
- Commands: Chief of Staff (Naval Staff)

Chinese name
- Traditional Chinese: 何學淵
- Simplified Chinese: 何学渊
- Hanyu Pinyin: Hé Xuéyuān
- IPA: [xɤ̌.ɕɥě.ɥɛ́n]

Peter Ho Hak Ean DUNU DUBC PJG PPA(E) PPA(P) PBS is a retired Singaporean senior civil servant. Ho was the chairman of the Urban Redevelopment Authority, Social Science Research Council, Singapore Centre for Environmental Life Sciences Engineering and National Supercomputing Centre. Ho is also a member of the council of the International Institute for Strategic Studies and a senior advisor to the Centre for Strategic Futures.

== Awards and decorations ==
- Order of Nila Utama (With High Distinction), in 2024.
- Distinguished Service Order, in 2016.
- Meritorious Service Medal, in 2007.
- Public Administration Medal (Military) (Gold), in 1997.
- Public Administration Medal (Military) (Silver), in 1983.
- Long Service Medal, in 1998.

== Works ==
- "A Mexican Fandango with a Poisonous Shrimp" in Beating the Odds Together: 50 Years of Singapore-Israel Ties. Ed. Mattia Tomba. Singapore: World Scientific Book, 2019 . ISBN 978-981-121-468-4 OCLC 1122747159

== See also ==
- Statutory boards of the Singapore Government
- Singapore civil service
