= Operations and technology management =

Operations and Technology Management (OTM) is an interdisciplinary major which prepares students to gain knowledge and skills in the areas of operations management, IT management, and data analytics. This major is typically offered as part of business school and the curriculum is designed to develop the skills needed to manage and improve business operations through the integrated use of theories and methods from both operations management and information technology management (IT). Because of its inter-disciplinary nature, students graduating with OTM degrees tend to have more career options across a wide range of industries. For instances, students with OTM degrees can pursue many roles across Operations, IT, and Analytics fields.

Many universities offer this major. For instance, the University of Portland offers a BBA in OTM and MS in OTM (MSOTM) programs. Harvard University offers MBA and DBA in Technology and operations management (TOM). The University of Wisconsin-Madison offers BBA and MBA programs in OTM. Cal Poly-Pomona offers programs in Technology and Operations Management (TOM). UCLA Anderson School of Management of Management offers Decisions, operations and technology management (DTOM) programs. Boston University offers programs in Operations & Technology Management (OTM). NYU's Stern offers a specialization in management of technology and operations.
