= Darjah Utama Nila Utama =

Singaporean national honour

Darjah Utama Nila Utama (Order of Nila Utama)
- Type: Order of Honour
- Established: 1975; 51 years ago
- Country: Singapore
- Eligibility: Singaporeans
- Awarded for: Service
- Status: Active
- Grades: Order of Nila Utama (With High Distinction); Order of Nila Utama (With Distinction); Order of Nila Utama
- Post-nominals: DUNU

Precedence
- Next (higher): Darjah Utama Temasek
- Next (lower): Sijil Kemuliaan
- Ribbon after 1996 Ribbon prior to 1996

The Darjah Utama Nila Utama (English: Order of Nila Utama) is Singapore's third most prestigious national honour, established in 1975. It is an Order conferred by the President of Singapore and was originally intended as the highest award for foreign dignitaries. Over time, it has been awarded predominantly to Singaporeans. The honour is named after the founder of the Kingdom of Singapura, Sang Nila Utama.

As of 1 August 2019, the Order comprises three grades:

- the Order of Nila Utama (With High Distinction),
- the Order of Nila Utama (With Distinction), and
- the Order of Nila Utama.

Recipients of the honour are entitled to use the post-nominal letters DUNU.

== History ==
Prior to August 2019, the 3 grades of the Order of Nila Utama were known as:

- First Class of the Order of Nila Utama
- Second Class of the Order of Nila Utama
- Third Class of the Order of Nila Utama
