= Darjah Utama Bakti Cemerlang =

Distinguished Service Order of Singapore

Darjah Utama Bakti Cemerlang (Distinguished Service Order)
- Type: Order of Honour
- Established: 1968; 57 years ago
- Country: Singapore
- Awarded for: Any person who has performed within Singapore any act or series of acts which constitute distinguished conduct
- Status: Active
- Post-nominals: DUBC
- Former grades: Pingat Bakti Chemerlang (Distinguished Service Medal)

Precedence
- Next (higher): Sijil Kemuliaan
- Next (lower): Pingat Kehormatan
- Equivalent: Darjah Utama Bakti Cemerlang (Tentera)
- Ribbon after 1996 Ribbon prior to 1996

The Darjah Utama Bakti Cemerlang (English: Distinguished Service Order) is a Singaporean national honour instituted in 1968. It was created to replace the Pingat Bakti Chemerlang (English: Distinguished Service Medal) and is awarded to any person who has performed within Singapore any act or series of acts which constitute distinguished conduct. It may be awarded to people performing acts of distinguished conduct outside Singapore under special circumstances.

The medal of the Darjah Utama Bakti Cemerlang is worn as a neck decoration pendant from a ribbon. Recipients are entitled to use the post-nominal letters DUBC.

The military equivalent of the award is the Darjah Utama Bakti Cemerlang (Tentera).

== See also ==
- Category: Recipients of the Darjah Utama Bakti Cemerlang
- Category: Recipients of the Darjah Utama Bakti Cemerlang (Tentera)
