= List of Darjah Utama Temasek recipients =

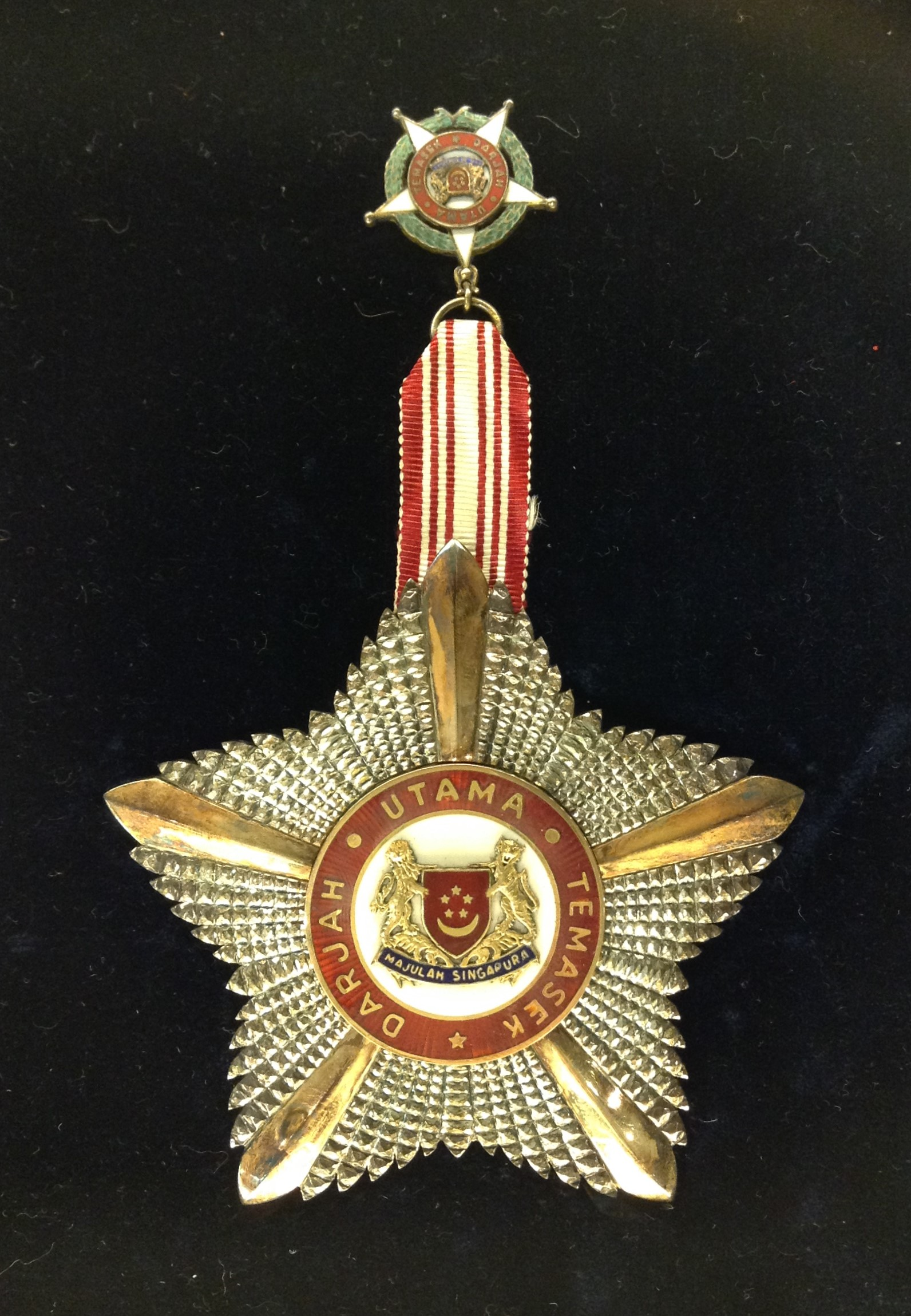
The Star (above) and the Badge (below) of the Darjah Utama Temasek

This is a list of recipients of the Darjah Utama Temasek, the highest civilian honour and the second most prestigious national honour overall, conferred by the President of Singapore.

== Recipients ==
This along with the ^ (caret) indicates the individual was admitted to the Darjah Utama Temasek in an honorary capacity.
This along with the * (asterisk) indicates the individual was admitted to the Darjah Utama Temasek posthumously

List of Darjah Utama Temasek recipients, with the year, grade, and role(s) held
Year	Recipient	Grade (if any)	Role(s)	Notes
1962	Yusof Ishak	First Class	Yang di-Pertuan Negara of Singapore	
1962	Lim Kim San		Chairman, Housing and Development Board; Deputy chairman, Economic Development Board; Deputy chairman, Public Service Commission; Board member, Singapore Polytechnic	
1963	Ahmed Ben Bella^		Prime Minister of Algeria	
1964	Gamal Abdel Nasser^		President of Egypt	
1967	Eisaku Satō^		Prime Minister of Japan	
1967	Norodom Sihanouk^		Head of State of Cambodia	
1972	Elizabeth II^	First Class	Queen of the United Kingdom	
1972	Prince Philip, Duke of Edinburgh^	First Class	Consort of the British monarch	
1974	Ferdinand Marcos^	First Class	President of the Philippines	
1974	Suharto^	First Class	President of Indonesia	
1984	Hon Sui Sen*	First Class	Former Minister of Finance	
1985	Goh Keng Swee	First Class	Former Deputy Prime Minister of Singapore	
1990	Hassanal Bolkiah^	First Class	Sultan of Brunei	
1990	S. Rajaratnam	First Class	Former Deputy Prime Minister of Singapore	
1993	Wee Kim Wee	First Class	Former President of Singapore	
1999	Yong Pung How	First Class	Former Chief Justice of Singapore	
2005	Sirajuddin of Perlis^		King of Malaysia	
2007	S. Dhanabalan	Second Class	Former Chairman, Temasek Holdings; Member, Council of Presidential Advisers	
2008	Chan Sek Keong	Second Class	Former Chief Justice of Singapore	
2009	Qaboos bin Said^	First Class	Sultan of Oman	
2013	S. R. Nathan	First Class	Former President of Singapore	
2014	Susilo Bambang Yudhoyono^	First Class	President of Indonesia	
2015	S. Dhanabalan	First Class	Chairman, Temasek	
2018	Tony Tan	First Class	Former President of Singapore	
2019	J. Y. Pillay	Distinction	Former chairman, Council of Presidential Advisers	
2020	S. Jayakumar	High Distinction	Senior legal adviser, Minister for Foreign Affairs	
2023	Halimah Yacob	High Distinction	Former President of Singapore	
2026	Eddie Teo	Distinction	Former chairman, Council of Presidential Advisers	
2026	Sundaresh Menon	Distinction	Chief Justice of Singapore	
