= Lee Tzu Yang =

Former Singaporean businessman

Lee Tzu Yang DUBC PJG BBM

Chairman of the Public Service Commission
- Incumbent
- Assumed office 1 August 2018
- Deputy: Chua Sock Koong
- Preceded by: Eddie Teo

Personal details
- Born: 1954 (age 71–72) Colony of Singapore
- Spouse: Veronica Tan
- Children: 3
- Education: London School of Economics and Political Science (BS); Anglo-Chinese School

Chinese name
- Traditional Chinese: 李子揚
- Simplified Chinese: 李子扬
Transcriptions
Standard Mandarin
- Hanyu Pinyin: Lǐ Zǐyáng
- IPA: [lì.tsì.jǎŋ]

Lee Tzu Yang (Note: Chinese: see Chinese name and romanisations) DUBC PJG BBM is a former Singaporean businessman. Lee currently chairs the Public Service Commission, and he was the chairman of the Shell Singapore from 2000 to 2014.

== Early life and education ==
In 1954, Lee Tzu Yang was born and he grew up in Bukit Timah, Singapore. His father, Tan Sri Lee Siow Mong (1915 – 31 August 1989), was a senior civil servant who served in both Singapore and Malaysia, and his mother, Puan Sri Grace Lee (née Tan Gek Eng; 1917 – 4 February 2007), was a housewife. Being the youngest in the family, Lee has four siblings, and one of his sisters is Anne Lee Tzu Pheng, a poet.

Lee attended Anglo-Chinese School and obtained a Senior Cambridge in 1970 and a Higher School Certificate in 1972. In 1976, Lee graduated from the London School of Economics and Political Science with a Bachelor of Science in economics.

== Career ==
In 1979, Lee joined Shell plc and rose through the ranks, becoming the vice president for strategy and portfolio in 1999. In July 2000, Lee was appointed as chairman of Shell Singapore, holding the position for 14 years, before retiring in October 2014.

On 12 August 2003, Lee was appointed by the Ministry of Information, Communications and the Arts (abbreviated as MITA, now known as MDDI) to be chairman of the Arts School Committee, to study the needs and feasibility of establishing a specialised school in arts. On 12 March 2004, the Report of the Committee on Specialised Arts School was presented to MITA. The recommendation of establishing a specialised school in arts was accepted by MITA, and announced in the 10th Parliament of Singapore on the next day. On 2 January 2008, Lee was appointed as the first chairman of the School of the Arts, Singapore.

On 6 January 2013, Lee was appointed as a member of the Council of Presidential Advisers for a six year term, serving President Tony Tan and President Halimah Yacob.

A member of the Esplanade board since 2003, Lee succeeded Theresa Foo as chairman of the board on 1 January 2015. Two weeks later, Lee announced plans to construct two mid-sized theatres, citing the need to support more artists and events. Eventually, the Singtel Waterfront Theatre was constructed as part of the plan. Lee was also appointed as chairman of the Casino Regulatory Authority on 2 April 2015.

On 13 April 2015, during the 12th Parliament of Singapore, Prime Minister Lee Hsien Loong announced the establishment of the Founders' Memorial Committee and appointed Lee as chairman. The committee engaged the public through dialogue sessions, and conceptualised the details for the memorial. Other members on the committee included National University of Singapore Vice Provost Lily Kong, former politician Sidek Saniff, and diplomat Gopinath Pillai.

On 2 May 2018, Lee was appointed as a member and deputy chairman of the Public Service Commission (PSC). A few months later, on 1 August 2018, Lee succeeded Eddie Teo as chairman of PSC.

== Personal life ==
Lee is married to Veronica Tan with two daughters and a son.

== Awards and decorations ==
- Distinguished Service Order, in 2022.
- Meritorious Service Medal, in 2014.
- Public Service Star, in 2005.
