= J. Y. Pillay =

Singaporean civil servant (born 1934)

J. Y. Pillay DUNU DUT
- ஜெ. ஒய். பிள்ளை
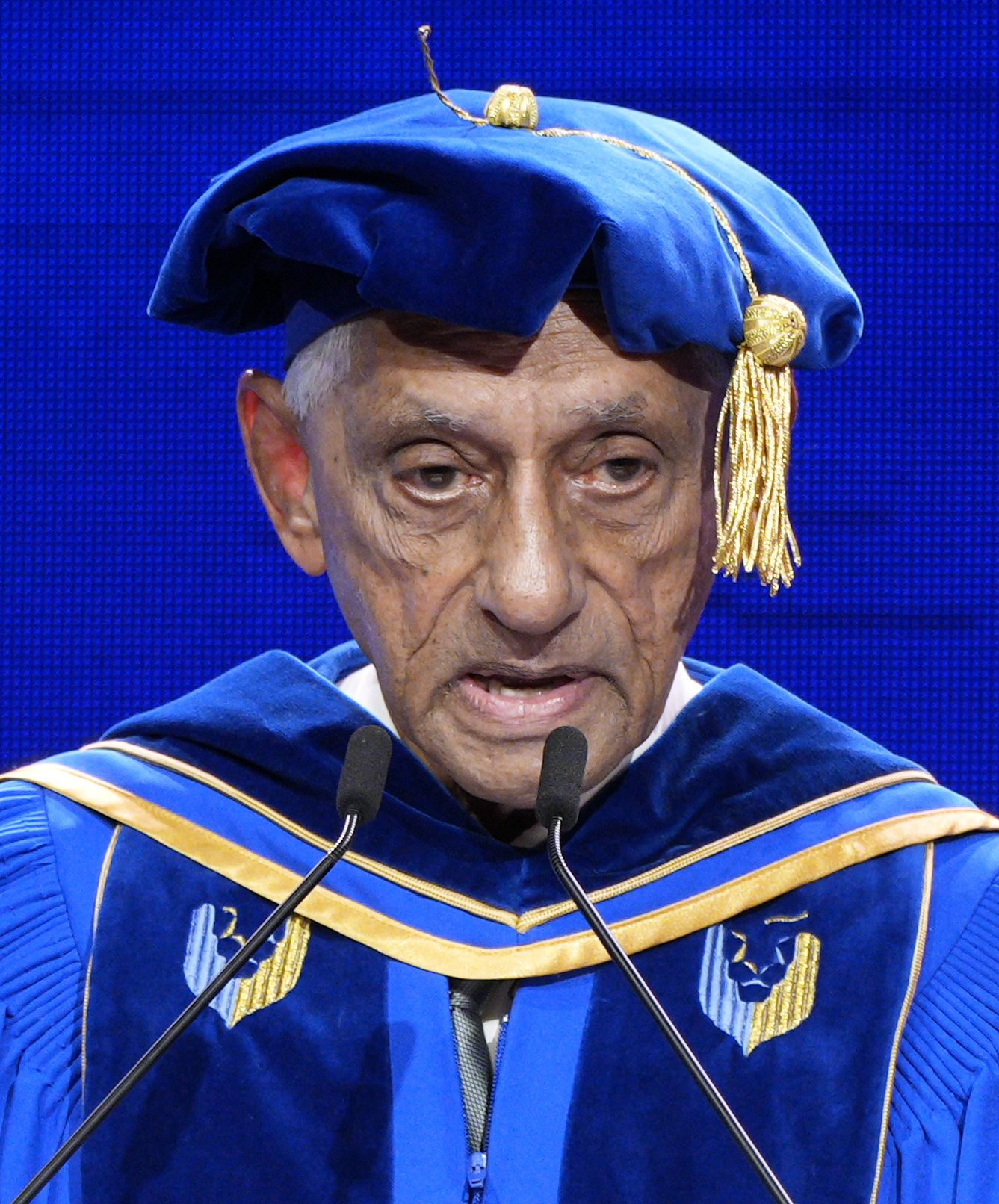
- Pillay in 2023

President of Singapore
- Acting; 1 September 2017 – 13 September 2017
- Prime Minister: Lee Hsien Loong
- Preceded by: Tony Tan
- Succeeded by: Halimah Yacob

Chairman of the Council of Presidential Advisers
- In office September 2005 – 2 January 2019
- President: S. R. Nathan; Tony Tan; Himself (acting); Halimah Yacob
- Preceded by: Sim Kee Boon
- Succeeded by: Eddie Teo
Other offices
Chairman of Singapore Airlines
In office 1972–1996
Preceded by	Position established
Succeeded by	Michael Fam
Managing Director of the Monetary Authority of Singapore
In office 1985–1989
Prime Minister	Lee Kuan Yew; Goh Chok Tong
Chairman of the Singapore Exchange
In office 1999–2010
Prime Minister	Goh Chok Tong; Lee Hsien Loong
Preceded by	Position established
Chairman of Tiger Airways
In office 2011–2014
Chancellor of Singapore Management University
In office 1 September 2015 – 1 August 2019
Preceded by	Yong Pung How
Succeeded by	Lim Chee Onn

Personal details
- Born: 30 March 1934 (age 92) Klang, British Malaya
- Spouse: Beatrice Rasammah (m. 1963)
- Education: Imperial College London (BEng)

Joseph Yuvaraj Pillay, also known as J. Y. Pillay DUNU (First Class) DUT (with Distinction) (born 30 March 1934), is a Singaporean retired civil servant who served as the acting President of Singapore in September 2017.

For 34 years, Pillay was one of Singapore's top-ranking civil servants. He is also one of the pioneers who helped build the Singapore economy after its independence in 1965, including the country's national airline Singapore Airlines, having served as its first chairman for 24 years from 1972 to 1996.

Pillay served as the country's acting president for 13 days from 1 to 13 September 2017 as an interregnum between Tony Tan and Halimah Yacob during the 2017 Singaporean presidential election. He had also served as the chairman of the Council of Presidential Advisers (CPA) between 2005 and 2019.

== Early life and education ==
Pillay was born Klang, British Malaya in 1934. He is an ethnic Tamil. He graduated from the University of London (UoL) with a Bachelor of Engineering (BEng) degree in 1956.

== Career ==
=== Singapore Airlines ===
His most significant contribution during his civil service was building Singapore Airlines (SIA) into a world-class carrier with a distinguished reputation. He served as Chairman of Singapore Airlines from 1972 until 1996. In 1978, his bold and calculated move to purchase 19 Boeing aircraft, including multiple Boeing 747s, at the total cost of US$900 million for the airline, made headlines worldwide as "the sale of the century" as it was the largest purchase at the time by any airline in the world. He is one of the few Civil Service officers to reach Staff Grade III.

=== Monetary Authority of Singapore ===
He was managing director of the Monetary Authority of Singapore (MAS) from 1985 to 1989.

=== Singapore Exchange ===
In the 1990s, he headed the advisory panel that reviewed the merger of the Stock Exchange of Singapore (SES) and the Singapore International Monetary Exchange (SIMEX). The resultant Singapore Stock Exchange (SGX) was established on 1 December 1999 and he was the first Chairman of the Singapore Exchange between 1999 and 2010.

== Post-civil service ==
Few can match his record of public service in the Ministry of Finance, Temasek, GIC, MAS, MND and not to speak of SIA and SGX.

— S. Dhanabalan

Pillay retired from civil service in March 1995 and subsequently served as the Singaporean High Commissioner to the United Kingdom and the Ambassador to Ireland until 1999.

He was the Chairman of Tiger Airways Holdings from 2011 until 2014. He was the Chairman of the Council of Presidential Advisers from 2005 until 2019.

Pillay was the longest serving chairman of the Council of Presidential Advisors (CPA). He stood down as Chairman of the CPA on 2 January 2019 which was handed over to Eddie Teo.

Pillay took over from former Chief Justice of Singapore Yong Pung How as Chancellor of Singapore Management University (SMU) from 1 September 2015. Pillay was then succeeded by Lim Chee Onn as the next Chancellor of SMU with effect from 1 August 2019.

Pillay was the Acting President from 1 September 2017 when President Tony Tan's term expired on 31 August 2017, until the next president Halimah Yacob, was sworn into office on 14 September 2017.

He is currently Rector of National University of Singapore (NUS) University Town's College of Alice and Peter Tan and adjunct professor at the Lee Kuan Yew School of Public Policy (LKYSPP).

== Awards ==
- Order of Nila Utama (2012)
- Order of Temasek (2019)

In 2012, the National University of Singapore (NUS) set up two professorships in his honour, for his contributions.

For his public service, Pillay was awarded the Order of Nila Utama (First Class), one of Singapore's most prestigious National Day Awards on 9 August 2012.

In August 2019, Pillay was awarded the Order of Temasek (With Distinction), Singapore's highest civilian honour.

In the same year, he received the Special Lifetime Achievement Award at the 4th South Asian Diaspora Convention organised by the NUS Institute of South Asian Studies (ISAS).
