= List of titles and honours of Norodom Sihanouk =

Norodom Sihanouk is a Cambodian statesman, who has received numerous honours.

== National ==
Award or decoration	Date
Knight Grand Cross of the Royal Order of Cambodia	
National Independence Medal	
Grand Cross of the Royal Order of Sowathara	
Knight Grand Cross of the Royal Order of Monisaraphon	
Knight Grand Cross of the Royal Order of Sahametrei	

== Foreign ==
Award or decoration	Country	Date
Imperial Order of the Dragon of Annam (1st class)	Annam (French protectorate)	3 April 1942
Order of the White Lion (1st class)	Czechoslovakia	1955
Grand Cross of the Legion of Honour	France	21 October 1941
Star of the Republic of Indonesia (1st class or Adipurna)	Indonesia	1 April 1968
Grand Cross with Collar of Order of the Million Elephants and the White Parasol	Kingdom of Laos	18 April 1963
The Most Exalted Order of the Crown of the Realm	Malaysia	1963
Grand Cross of the National Order of Mali	Mali	1973
Grand Cordon of the Order of the Throne	Morocco	26 May 1973
Order of the National Flag (1st class)	North Korea	1965
International Kim Il Sung Prize	North Korea	29 March 2012
Grand Cross of the Order of Sikatuna	Philippines	30 January 1956
Star of Temasek	Singapore	1967
Grand Cross of the National Order of Vietnam	South Vietnam	1959
Order of Suvorov (1st class)	Soviet Union	7 July 1956
Grand Cross of the Cross of Military Merit	Spanish State	22 June 1956
Knight of the Order of the Royal House of Chakri	Thailand	15 December 1954
Order of the Yugoslav Great Star	SFR Yugoslavia	17 January 1968
