= Net neutrality in Singapore =

Since June 2011, Singapore has had a law governing net neutrality, which promised all internet users would be treated equally on the internet. It prevents them from being discriminated against or charged differently based on the user, content, site, platform, application, type of attached equipment, or mode of communication.

== History ==
=== 2011 ===
Infocomm Development Authority (IDA) publishes the Policy Framework for Net Neutrality on 16 June 2011.

=== 2014 ===
On 3 March 2014, there is the first attempt of Singtel CEO to convince the public about net neutrality. The reaction of Infocomm Development Authority (IDA) was prompt. Then on 21 November 2014: Obama's call for net neutrality. What is Singapore's position on the issue?

=== 2015 ===
Chua Sock Koong comes back again on 22 January 2015 and makes the same statements as one year before. In the meantime, the local press publishes an article about how strong net neutrality rules are. On 12 March 2015 there is a publication which basically says that Singaporeans don't need to stand up for Net Neutrality (yet).

== Legal aspects ==
=== Completed Consultations and Decisions ===
There is a Policy Framework for Net Neutrality, dated back to the 16 June 2011 (originally 11 November 2010), published by the IDA.

Although IDA documents for ISP license promotes net neutrality, it does not enforce it completely. Also, they do not prohibit ISP from throttling their service in accordance with their business interests. At that time, they already referenced to: Net neutrality in the United States on Wikipedia within their Response to the Policy Framework for Net Neutrality which dated back to 16 June 2011.

=== Pending Decisions ===
On 15 April 2015 Infocomm Development Authority (IDA) published an update on "The Internet Protocol Transit and Peering Landscape in Singapore" which is closely related to the overall net neutrality discussion.

== See also ==
- Acts like: Stop Online Piracy Act and PROTECT IP Act where just the beginning of the Net Neutrality discussion worldwide
- Anti-Counterfeiting Trade Agreement signed by Singapore by 1 October 2011
- Trans-Pacific Partnership signed by Singapore Government by 28 May 2006.
