= Chew Hock Leong =

Singaporean banker (1897–1967)

Chew Hock Leong JP
- Chew in 1949

Chairman of the Public Service Commission
- In office 29 January 1957 – 16 July 1959
- Preceded by: W. L. Blythe
- Succeeded by: Yusof Ishak

Personal details
- Born: 1897 Singapore, Straits Settlements
- Died: 19 May 1967 (aged 70) Singapore
- Spouse: Goh Seng Neo
- Children: 5

Chinese name
- Chinese: 周福隆
Transcriptions
Standard Mandarin
- Hanyu Pinyin: Zhōu Fúlóng
- IPA: [ʈʂóʊ.fǔ.lʊ̌ŋ]

Chew Hock Leong (Note: Chinese: see Chinese name and romanisation) JP (c. 1897 – 19 May 1967) was a Singaporean banker who served as chairman of the Public Service Commission from 1957 to 1959.

A prominent figure in Singapore's early financial sector, he served as the general manager of the Oversea-Chinese Banking Corporation. In 1930, when he sold the patent of a flattening device to Eastman Kodak, he was believed to be the first local Chinese inventor to create and sell "an important invention" to a multi-national company.

== Early life and education ==
In 1897, Chew was born. He was the eldest son, and had seven brothers and four sisters. His father, Chew Boon Lay, was from Changchow, China, and bought huge plots land in Jurong for farming. Boon Lay is named after him. His mother, Ong Cheng Neo, was a Peranakan from Malacca.

Chew attended Raffles Institution. In 1915, he obtained a Senior Cambridge.

== Career ==
Chew began his career as a clerk in the high courts. One of his father's friends felt that Chew was "wasted in the high courts", and introduced him to the Chinese Commercial Bank, as its secretary.

In 1930, Chew invented a device to maintain flat the portion of the exposed film to form a sharp image. The invention was later sold to Eastman Kodak. He was believed to be the first local Chinese to create and sell "an important invention" to a multi-national company.

Chew was later the manager of the Chinese Commercial Bank, and the Oversea-Chinese Banking Corporation (OCBC). In July 1940, in response to the Government implementing a remittance quota, Chew felt that a quota will be "objectionable" and "give rise to an undesirable racket", as many workers need to remit money back to support their family.

In January 1947, Chew was appointed as a justice of the peace. In January 1948, he was appointed as a member of the Malayan Board of Income Tax.

In January 1949, Chew resigned in protest as a member of the Singapore Improvement Trust, after the lowest tender of a project in Balestier Road was rejected. In May 1949, Chew left for United Kingdom on RMS Carthage. He represented the Singapore Chinese Chamber of Commerce as a delegate, to discuss trade with the British Government.

In September 1952, Chew was appointed as a trustee of the Silver Jubilee Fund. In April 1955, he was appointed as a board member of Singapore Polytechnic (SP), replacing Lin Yutang. In September 1956, Chew retired as general manager of OCBC, and joined the Public Service Commission (PSC) as a board member. In October 1956, due to his appointment to PSC, Chew resigned from SP, adding that it was "impossible to serve on the Polytechnic Board in his present state of health".

On 29 January 1957, Chew succeeded W. L. Blythe as chairman of PSC. In February 1957, the 1st Legislative Assembly approved his monthly salary of $2,300. On 16 July 1959, Chew stepped down as chairman of PSC, and he was succeeded by Yusof Ishak. In November 1959, Chew became chairman of the Malayan Rubber Export Registration Board, with a monthly salary of $2,000.

== Personal life ==
Chew was a Christian, and he was the president of the Straits Chinese Epworth League. In 1927, the league donated new year gifts to various hospitals for the poor. He was also a trustee of the Straits Chinese Methodist Episcopal Church.

Chew was married to Goh Seng Neo (c. 1904–2 September 1983), and they had five children. In March 1937, his daughter, Renee Chew Bee Neo, made headlines as she was the first prize winner in an essay competition, against all school children in the British Empire who took part.

On 12 September 1960, during a rubber conference at Victoria Memorial Hall, Chew suffered a myocardial infarction, and he was sent to a private clinic and then to the General Hospital. It was revealed that he suffered from two similar attacks recently.

Chew died on 19 May 1967.

== Patents ==
- U.S. patent 1831790A, 1931, roll film photographic camera and the like
- U.S. patent 2639718A, 1953, combined cigarette support, extinguisher, and economiser
- U.S. patent 2951429A, 1960, photographic cameras
