= Sim Kee Boon =

Singaporean civil servant (born 1929)

Sim Kee Boon DUBC
- 沈基文
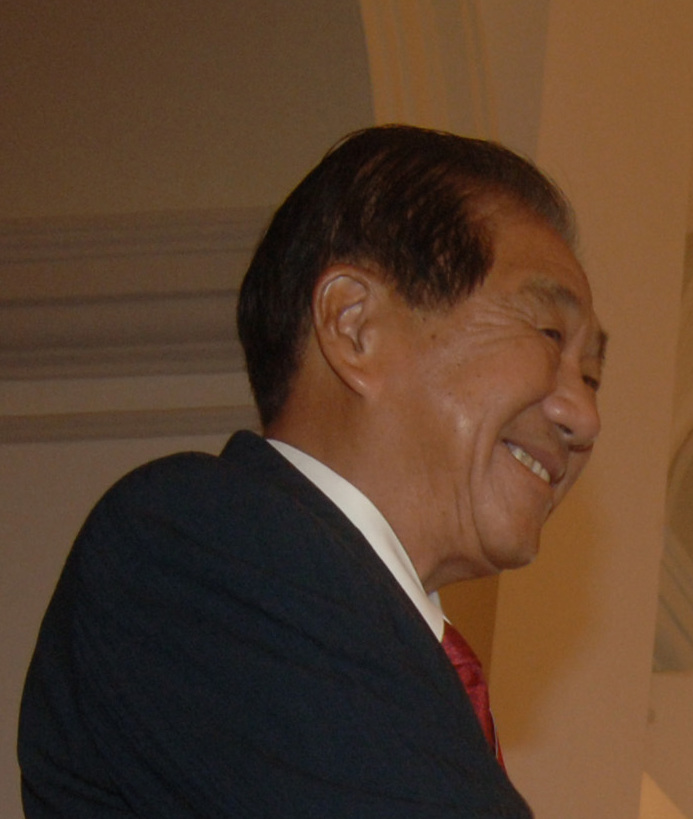
- Sim in 2005

Chairman of the Council of Presidential Advisers
- In office January 2004 – September 2005
- President: S. R. Nathan
- Succeeded by: J.Y. Pillay

Chairman of the Civil Aviation Authority of Singapore
- In office 1984–1999

Permanent Secretary of the Public Service Division
- In office 1979–1984

Permanent Secretary of the Ministry of Communications
- In office 1975–1984

Permanent Secretary of the Ministry of Finance
- In office 1968–1974

Permanent Secretary of Ministry of National Development, Ministry of Finance Deputy Chairman of the Tariff Advisory Board of Malaysia
- In office 1962–1965

Personal details
- Born: 5 September 1929 Singapore, Straits Settlements
- Died: 9 November 2007 (aged 78) Singapore
- Spouse: Jeanette Sim
- Children: 5
- Education: Anglo Chinese School; University of Malaya; London School of Economics

Sim Kee Boon DUBC (Chinese: 沈基文; pinyin: Shěn Jīwén) was a Singaporean civil servant who played a role in the success of Changi Airport and turned the fortunes of Keppel Shipyard around.

Sim graduated with Bachelor of Arts in Economics from University of Malaya in 1953, and joined the civil service that year. By 1962, aged 33, he was made acting permanent secretary in the National Development Ministry, before taking charge of the Finance Ministry as well as Intraco, the state trading company. He was also the Chairman of the Council of Presidential Advisers.

== Changi Airport ==
As Permanent Secretary at the Communications Ministry from 1975 to 1984, he managed the then biggest civil project in Singapore - the construction and opening of Changi Airport - from land reclamation to squatter resettlement.

When Sim was given the mammoth task, he knew little about building an airport, and asked questions and consulted his officers and staff. Sim was known for his attention to detail. As Chairman of the Civil Aviation Authority of Singapore (CAAS) for 15 years from 1984, he ensured that the airport had kept up with quality standards.

He also introduced free local phone calls in the transit area and the famous '12-minute rule'. This means the first bag must be ready for retrieval 12 minutes after an aircraft grounds to a halt. And he also stressed that the different players - CAAS, immigration and customs authorities, airport retailers, eateries - must work together as a team for Changi to succeed.

== Keppel Corporation ==
After Changi Airport, between 1984 and 1999, Sim also served as Chairmen of Keppel Corporation and the Civil Aviation Authority of Singapore. While he initially intended to wind down Keppel as it was loss-making, he had a change of heart. Keppel renewed growth within 5 years. Sim continued the diversification of Keppel that was initiated by his predecessor George Edwin Bogaars into other fields like engineering, property, financial services as well as developing shipyards in other parts of the world.

== Tanah Merah Country Club ==
As Sim and his wife Jeanette were avid golfers, Sim was also the founding chairman of Tanah Merah Country Club.

== Death ==
In October 2007, his illness took a turn for the worse, and had to undergo chemotherapy. He died on 9 November 2007 at the Singapore General Hospital, after a 17-year battle with stomach cancer.

== Awards and decorations ==
- Distinguished Service Order, in 1991.

== Biography ==
Low, Shi Ping; Sim, Leanne (2022). Sim Kee Boon: The Businessman Bureaucrat. Landmark Books Pte Ltd. ISBN 978-981-18-5270-1.
