= Eddie Teo =

Singaporean civil servant (born 1947)

Eddie Teo DUT DUNU DUBC PJG PPA(E)
- 张赞成

Chairman of the Council of Presidential Advisers
- In office 2 January 2019 – 1 June 2026
- President: Halimah Yacob; Tharman Shanmugaratnam
- Preceded by: J. Y. Pillay
- Succeeded by: Tan Chong Meng

Chairman of the Public Service Commission
- In office 1 August 2008 – 1 August 2018
- Deputy: Lee Tzu Yang
- Preceded by: Andrew Chew
- Succeeded by: Lee Tzu Yang

Singapore's High Commissioner to Australia
- In office 2006–2008
- President: S. R. Nathan
- Prime Minister: Lee Hsien Loong

Permanent Secretary in the Prime Minister's Office
- In office 1998–2005
- Prime Minister: Goh Chok Tong; Lee Hsien Loong

Permanent Secretary for Defence
- In office 1994–2000
- Minister: Tony Tan

Director of the Internal Security Department
- In office 1982–1986
- Prime Minister: Lee Kuan Yew; Goh Chok Tong
- Preceded by: Lim Chye Heng
- Succeeded by: Tjong Yik Min

Director of the Security and Intelligence Division
- In office 1979–1994
- Prime Minister: Lee Kuan Yew; Goh Chok Tong
- Preceded by: S. R. Nathan
- Succeeded by: Choi Shing Kwok

Personal details
- Born: 27 May 1947 (age 79) Colony of Singapore
- Education: University of Oxford (BA); London School of Economics (MS)

Eddie Teo Chan Seng
- Simplified Chinese: 张赞成
- Traditional Chinese: 張贊成
Transcriptions
Standard Mandarin
- Hanyu Pinyin: Zhāng Zànchéng

Eddie Teo Chan Seng DUT DUNU DUBC PJG PPA(E) (Chinese: 张赞成; pinyin: Zhāng Zànchéng 27 May 1947) is a Singaporean civil servant who has been serving as Chairman of the Council of Presidential Advisers since 2019.

== Education ==
A President's Scholar, Teo graduated from the University of Oxford in 1970 with a Bachelor of Arts degree in philosophy, politics and economics (PPE).

He subsequently went to complete a Master of Science degree in international relations at the London School of Economics in 1974.

== Career ==
Teo joined the Security and Intelligence Division (SID) in 1970, before becoming Director in 1979, a post he served until 1994. From 1982 to 1986, he held the position of Director of the Internal Security Department concurrently.

He was Permanent Secretary for Defence from 1994 to 2000 and Permanent Secretary in the Prime Minister's Office from 1998 to 2005. Teo retired in 2005, after 35 years of public service. He was Singapore's High Commissioner to Australia from 2006 to 2008.

He served as Chairman of the Public Service Commission from 2008 to 2018, Chairman of the Presidential Council for Religious Harmony from 2017 to 2019 and Senior Advisor of Temasek International Advisors Pte Ltd from 2019 to 2020.

Teo was appointed as Chairman of the Council of Presidential Advisors on 2 January 2019. He stepped down on 1 June 2026, and he was succeeded by Tan Chong Meng.

== Awards ==
- Order of Temasek, in 2026.
- Order of Nila Utama, in 2017.
- Distinguished Service Order, in 2006.
- Meritorious Service Medal, in 1997.
- Public Administration Medal (Gold), in 1983.
