= Bintang Temasek =

Singaporean national honour

Bintang Temasek (Star of Temasek)
- Type: Decoration
- Established: 24 July 1970; 55 years ago
- Country: Singapore
- Eligibility: Members of the Singapore Armed Forces, Singapore Police Force or Singapore Civil Defence Force
- Awarded for: Acts of exceptional courage and skill or for exhibiting conspicuous devotion to duty in circumstances of extreme danger
- Status: Active
- Post-nominals: BT

Statistics
- Total inductees: 0

Precedence
- Next (lower): Darjah Utama Temasek
- Ribbon after 1996 Ribbon prior to 1996

The Bintang Temasek (English: Star of Temasek) is the most prestigious of Singapore's national honours, established on 24 July 1970. It is conferred solely upon members of the Singapore Armed Forces (SAF), the Singapore Police Force (SPF) or the Singapore Civil Defence Force (SCDF) who have demonstrated acts of exceptional courage and skill, or have shown conspicuous devotion to duty in circumstances of extreme danger. The decoration may be awarded posthumously, and recipients are entitled to use the post-nominal letters BT.

Since its institution, no individual has yet received the Bintang Temasek. The insignia is to be worn on the left side of the outer garment, suspended from a ribbon. It remains the highest recognition for valour or devotion to duty in the face of extraordinary peril within Singapore's uniformed services.

== History ==
The Bintang Temasek was technically conferred upon the Prime Minister of Cambodia, Norodom Sihanouk, during Lee Kuan Yew's state visit to Phnom Penh in 1967. However, this occurred before the honour was formally established in Singapore in 1970 and is therefore not officially recognised.

== Recipients ==
An extremely rare honour, it has not been awarded to anyone since its inception.
