= Chua Sock Koong =

Singaporean business executive (born 1957)

Chua Sock Koong BBM
- Born: 14 September 1957 (age 68)
- Occupation: Businesswoman
- Office: CEO of Singtel (2007–2021)
- Board member of: Singtel Group; Singapore Management University Board of Trustees; Public Service Commission

Chinese name
- Traditional Chinese: 蔡淑君
- Simplified Chinese: 蔡淑君
Transcriptions
Standard Mandarin
- Hanyu Pinyin: Cài Shūjūn
- IPA: [tsʰâɪ.ʂú.tɕwə́n]

Chua Sock Koong BBM (born 14 September 1957) is the former CEO of Singtel, having held this position from April 2007 to December 2020.

== Education ==
Chua completed her education at Raffles Girls School and Raffles Institution. Chua holds a Bachelor of Accountancy (First Class Honours) from the University of Singapore.

== Career ==
Appointed Group Chief Executive Officer in April 2007, Chua directed Singtel's global strategy and oversees its consumer, enterprise and digital businesses. Before helming Singtel as Group CEO, Chua served in various key capacities within the company, most notably CEO International and Group CFO, after first joining as Treasurer in 1989. She was instrumental in the corporatisation of Singtel in 1992 and its subsequent successful listing on the Singapore Stock Exchange a year later. She also restructured the company for competition in the lead up to the full liberalisation of the Singapore telecoms market in 2000.

Chua led Singtel's transformation from a traditional telecommunications company into a communications technology company.

In February 2014, Chua asked for regulators to grant telecommunications companies the right to charge technology companies such as WhatsApp and Skype, for use of telecommunication networks, which she said was necessary because of the fall in telecommunication companies' revenues from phone calls and text messaging as a result of competition from these new carriers.

Faced with the realities of a small domestic market, Chua was part of the core leadership team which developed Singtel's internationalisation strategy which accounts for the Group's acquisition of Optus in Australia and a host of other regional telecom investments.

As CEO International, she stepped up Singtel's diversification across some of Asia's fastest growing economies, leading and overseeing investments in India's Bharti Airtel, Indonesia's Telkomsel, Thailand's AIS and Philippines' Globe.

== External boards and appointments ==
In 2019, she became the first woman to join Singapore's Council of Presidential Advisers when she was made an alternate member by President Halimah Yacob. She was appointed a full member of the council in 2020.

Chua is also the Deputy Chairman of the Public Service Commission in Singapore.

She was Deputy Chair of the GSMA Board from 2019 to 2020.

In 2023, she was named a member of the McKinsey & Company External Advisory Group.

She is also a Fellow Member of the Institute of Singapore Chartered Accountants and holds a CFA charter.

== Awards and decorations ==
- Public Service Star, in 2019.
