= Public Service Commission (Singapore) =

Civil service oversight body

- Logo of PSC

Agency overview
- Formed: January 1, 1951
- Headquarters: 100 Victoria Street #08-01 National Library 188064; 1°17′51″N 103°51′15″E
- Agency executives: Lee Tzu Yang, Chairman; Chua Sock Koong, Deputy Chairman
- Website: https://www.psc.gov.sg
- Agency ID: T08GA0008B

The Public Service Commission (PSC) has a constitutional role to appoint, confirm, promote, transfer, dismiss and exercise disciplinary control over public officers in Singapore. It is constituted under Part IX of the Constitution of Singapore.

The PSC also retains two key non-constitutional roles. It considers the suitability of candidates for appointment as chief executive officers of statutory boards; it is also responsible for the planning and administration of scholarships provided by the Government of Singapore. Members are appointed by the president, in consultation with the prime minister.

== Appointments ==
According to the Constitution, the board "shall consist of a Chairman and not less than five and not more than 14 other members".

Title	Name	Date of Appointment	Ref.
Chairman	Lee Tzu Yang	1 August 2018, as chairman. 2 May 2018, as member and deputy chairman.	
Deputy Chairman	Chua Sock Koong	29 January 2020, as deputy chairman. 30 January 2009, as member.	
Members	Lily Kong	30 January 2009	
Members	Alan Chan	7 September 2010	
Members	Sudha Nair	9 January 2015	
Members	Benjamin Ong	1 December 2020	
Members	Euleen Goh	1 April 2021	
Members	Ramlee bin Buang	1 August 2022	
Members	Warren Fernandez	1 June 2023	
Members	Geraldine Chin	10 July 2023	
Members	Seck Wai Kwong	15 February 2024	

== Chairmen ==
Name	Years served
Frederic Gordon Smith	1951–1952
Alfred William Frisby	1952–1956
Lim Han Hoe	1956
Wilfred Lawson Blythe	1957
Chew Hock Leong	1957–1959
Yusof Ishak	1959
Lim Eng Bee	1959–1961
Phay Seng Whatt	1962–1975
Tan Teck Chwee	1975–1988
Lee Hee Seng	1988–1998
Andrew Chew	1998–2008
Eddie Teo	2008–2018
Lee Tzu Yang	2018–present

== See also ==
- Organisation of the Government of Singapore
- Statutory boards of the Government of Singapore
- Singapore Civil Service
- President's Scholar
- The SAF Scholarship
