= Halimah Yacob =

President of Singapore from 2017 to 2023

Halimah Yacob DUT
- حليمة يعقوب
- Halimah in 2018

8th President of Singapore
- In office 14 September 2017 – 14 September 2023
- Prime Minister: Lee Hsien Loong
- Preceded by: Tony Tan; J. Y. Pillay (acting)
- Succeeded by: Tharman Shanmugaratnam

7th Speaker of the Parliament of Singapore
- In office 14 January 2013 – 7 August 2017
- Deputy: Charles Chong; Seah Kian Peng; Lim Biow Chuan
- Preceded by: Michael Palmer
- Succeeded by: Tan Chuan-Jin

Member of Parliament for Marsiling–Yew Tee GRC
- In office 11 September 2015 – 7 August 2017
- Preceded by: Constituency established
- Succeeded by: PAP held

Member of Parliament for Jurong GRC
- In office 3 November 2001 – 24 August 2015
- Preceded by: Constituency established
- Succeeded by: PAP held

Personal details
- Born: Halimah binte Yacob; 23 August 1954 (age 72) Colony of Singapore
- Party: Independent (2017–present)
- Other political affiliations: People's Action Party (2001–2017)
- Spouse: Mohammed Abdullah Alhabshee (m. 1980)
- Children: 5
- Education: University of Singapore (LLB); National University of Singapore (LLM)

Halimah binte Yacob (Note: Jawi: حليمة بنت يعقوب) (born 23 August 1954) is a Singaporean politician and lawyer who was the eighth president of Singapore from 2017 to 2023, making her the first woman. A former member of the People's Action Party (PAP), she served as the Member of Parliament (MP) for the Bukit Batok East division of the Jurong Group Representation Constituency (GRC) from 2001 to 2015 and for the Marsiling division of the Marsiling–Yew Tee GRC from 2015 to 2017.

Following a constitutional amendment in 2016, the 2017 presidential election was reserved for candidates from the Malay community. To qualify, Halimah resigned from the PAP and her position as an MP, with her Marsiling division covered by other members of the constituency from 7 August until the next general election. She ran as an independent candidate, as required for eligibility, and subsequently won in an uncontested election because her rivals did not meet the necessary qualifications. She was sworn in on 14 September.

During her presidency, Halimah utilised her discretionary powers to approve emergency funding for Singapore's response to the COVID-19 pandemic and advocated for women's rights. She chose not to seek re-election in the 2023 presidential election, concluding her term on 13 September, after which she was succeeded by Tharman Shanmugaratnam.

== Early life and education ==
Halimah was born on 23 August 1954 at her family home on Queen Street in Singapore during British colonial rule, to an Indian father and Malay mother. Her father was a watchman who died due to a heart attack when she was eight years old, leaving her and four siblings to be brought up by her mother. Her family was in poverty at the time of her father's death, and she helped her mother to sell nasi padang outside the former Singapore Polytechnic (now Bestway Building) along Prince Edward Road.

Halimah attended Singapore Chinese Girls' School and Tanjong Katong Girls' School. She graduated from the University of Singapore (now the National University of Singapore (NUS)) in 1978 with a Bachelor of Laws and was called to the Singapore Bar in 1981. Halimah earned a Master of Laws from NUS in 2001 and received an honorary Doctor of Law degree from NUS in 2016.

== Trade unionist ==
Halimah began her career in 1978 as a legal officer at the National Trades Union Congress (NTUC) and was appointed director of its legal services department in 1992. She advanced within NTUC, holding roles such as assistant director of the Research Unit, Director of the Women's Development Secretariat, and Executive Secretary of the United Workers of Electronics and Electrical Industries. She also served as Assistant Secretary-General from 1999 to 2007 and Deputy Secretary-General from 2007 to 2011. In 1999, Halimah became the director of the Singapore Institute of Labour Studies (now Ong Teng Cheong Labour Leadership Institute). She was elected as the Workers' Vice-chairperson of the Standards Committee of the International Labour Conference (ILC) in Geneva, serving from 2000 to 2002 and in 2005. Between 2003 and 2004, she was the Workers' Spokesperson for the ILC Committee on Human Resources Development and Training.

== Early political career ==
Her first political candidacy began in the 2001 general election, where she joined a five-member People's Action Party (PAP) team running for Jurong GRC, led by Minister Lim Boon Heng. Tharman Shanmugaratnam, who would later succeed her as president, also made his political debut alongside her in this election. Halimah represented Bukit Batok East as an MP until 2015, after which she was elected to represent the newly-formed Marsiling–Yew Tee GRC from 2015 to 2017.

During her first term, Halimah was appointed Minister of State for Community Development, Youth and Sports. After a cabinet reshuffle in November 2012, she transitioned to serve as Minister of State for Social and Family Development. In addition to her ministerial roles, Halimah was also the chairperson of the Jurong Town Council.

On 8 January 2013, Prime Minister Lee Hsien Loong nominated Halimah to succeed Michael Palmer as Speaker of Parliament after Palmer resigned due to revelations of an extramarital affair. She was elected to the position on 14 January 2013, becoming the first woman in Singapore's history to hold this role. During her tenure, she also led a legislative delegation to Mexico. In January 2015, she was co-opted into the PAP's Central Executive Committee (CEC), the party's highest decision-making body.

In a strong response to ISIS-linked beliefs, Singapore detained 26 members of a foreign jihadist cell involved in extremist teachings and intervened in several cases of self-radicalised Singaporeans attempting to join ISIS in Syria in 2015. During her time as an MP, Halimah condemned ISIS's acts as un-Islamic and harmful to the image of Islam, stressing that countering its ideology is more essential than military action. She urges young people to resist extremism online and supports community gatherings to build resilience, highlighting the shared responsibility to prevent self-radicalisation. Halimah also encourages Muslim parents to stay vigilant and promote open communication within families and communities.

== 2017 presidential election ==
While speaking during the debate on the Presidential Elections Amendment Bill on 6 February 2017, Minister in the Prime Minister's Office Chan Chun Sing addressed Halimah as "Madam President" twice instead of "Madam Speaker", drawing laughter from the house and leading to widespread speculation that Halimah would be the party's preferred candidate for the reserved presidential elections.

In 2016, presidential eligibility criteria were changed so that if the presidency had not been held by a member of one of Singapore's major race communities in the previous five terms, the next term would be reserved for members of that community. As a result of the change, the 2017 presidential election was reserved for Malay candidates. Later, eligibility criteria were changed again to require private sector candidates to be a senior executive of a company worth at least S$500 million. Public sector candidates who have held certain offices are automatically eligible; Halimah qualified under this rule.

To contest for the elected presidency, Halimah announced on 6 August 2017 that she would step down as speaker of parliament and MP for Marsiling–Yew Tee the following day. She also resigned from the PAP. Prime Minister Lee accepted her resignation, expressing gratitude for her contributions to labour, community, and legislative service and expressing confidence in her ability to fulfill the responsibilities of the presidency. Halimah was widely seen as the PAP's candidate for the 2017 presidential election and received endorsement from Prime Minister Lee.

In an interview on 11 August 2017, Halimah expressed her support for the reserved presidential election, saying it demonstrated Singapore's commitment to multiracialism alongside meritocracy. While some critics argued the reserved election compromised meritocracy, Halimah disagreed, emphasising that all candidates must meet the same eligibility criteria, ensuring no compromise between merit and representation. Responding to comments on the lower qualifying threshold for public sector candidates, Halimah said that the system is transparent and has been in place since 1991.

=== Campaign ===
On 25 August 2017, Halimah launched her official campaign website, including her campaign slogan "Do Good Do Together", which was criticised by many for being ungrammatical. She defended her slogan, explaining that it is meant to be catchy. In response to public queries whether Halimah broke election rules by campaigning ahead of the nomination day, the Elections Department clarified that its rule which forbids candidates from campaigning before close of nomination only applies to candidates who are nominated.

Halimah's campaign expenses reached only $220,875 out of the $754,982.40 legal limit. Her expenses were used for promotional material, room rental, office supplies, food, transport and phone bills. Queries were also raised regarding Halimah's long affiliation with the PAP and perceived lack of political independence as she quit the party just one month ago to campaign in the election. Halimah responded by comparing herself to former President Ong Teng Cheong, who was also a PAP member before being elected. She also cited that she had abstained from voting in an amendment for the Human Organ Transplant Act in 2007.

Former NMP Calvin Cheng suggested that Halimah did not appear to have the professional experience needed to manage the financial reserves. According to Publichouse.sg's estimate, her financial management involvement was only about $40 million, much less than the stringent $500 million shareholders' equity requirement for private sector candidates.

=== Election ===
Being the only candidate to be issued a Certificate of Eligibility, Halimah became the eighth president of Singapore. Tan Cheng Bock, a former presidential candidate, wrote that Halimah "will occupy the most controversial presidency in the history of Singapore". The Economist described her as "popular and able".

=== Reactions ===
After Halimah's resignation as the sole minority MP in Singapore's Marsiling–Yew Tee GRC, opposition parties and residents called for a by-election, which the ruling PAP government declined to hold. In response, resident Wong Souk Yee, with the support of the Singapore Democratic Party (SDP), filed a lawsuit in the High Court, arguing that the Parliamentary Elections Act requires a by-election to be held when a vacancy occurs in a GRC. Wong's lawyer cited Article 49(1) of the Constitution, which mandates that any vacant parliamentary seat be filled through an election, to support this claim.

After the Elections Department announced that Halimah was the only possible candidate for the presidency, global media monitoring house Meltwater observed a significant increase in negative sentiment on social media surrounding the presidential elections from 11 to 12 September 2017. The sentiment observed was 83% negative and 17% positive. Following the announcement, a number of Singaporeans began using the hashtag #NotMyPresident on Facebook and Twitter to voice their disappointment. In response, The Straits Times reported that there was the use of #halimahismypresident by an "equally vocal group", urging "Singaporeans to rally round their next president".

== Presidency (2017–2023) ==
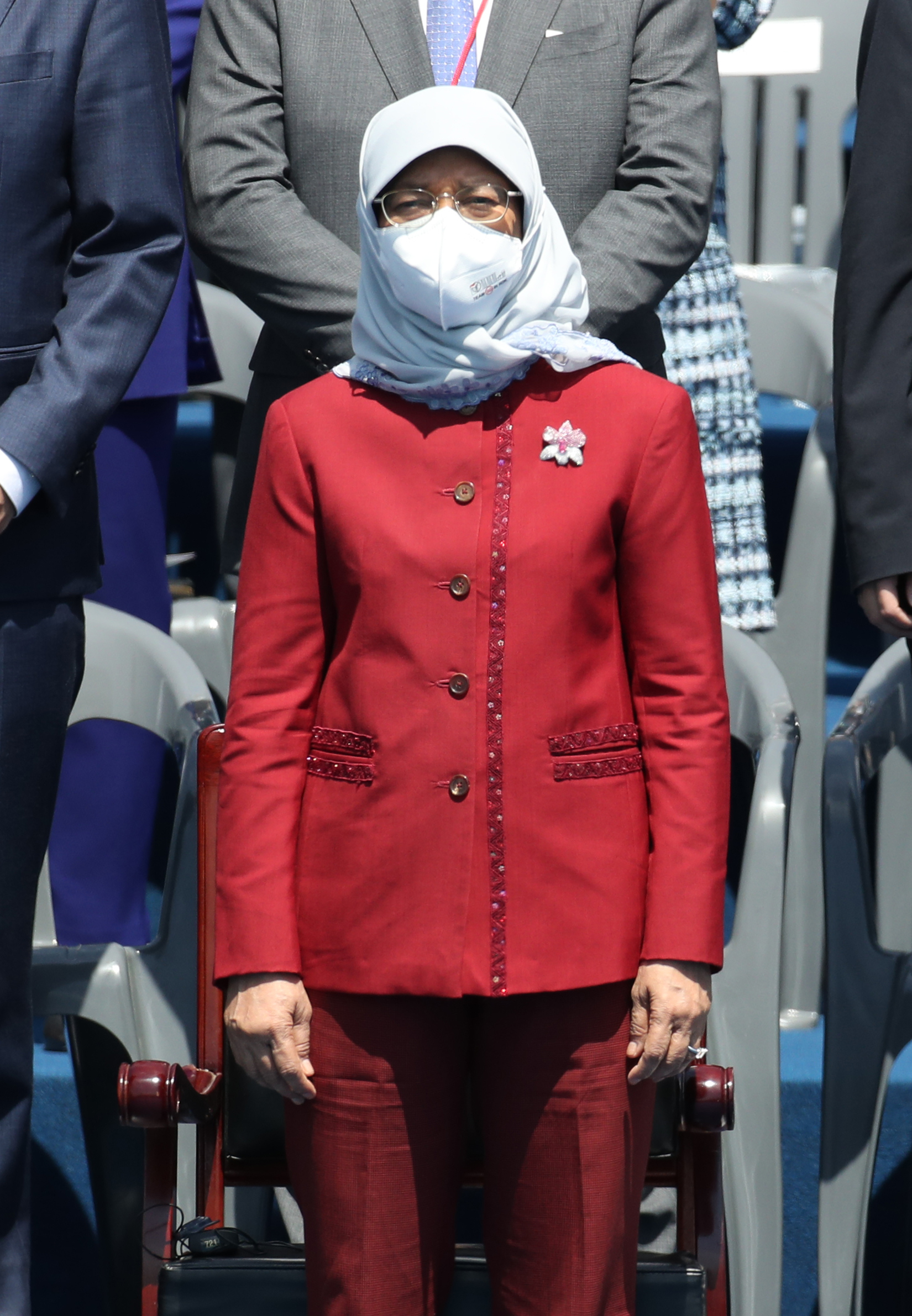
Halimah at the inauguration of South Korean president Yoon Suk-yeol in Seoul, 10 May 2022

Halimah was sworn in as the President of Singapore on 14 September 2017 at The Istana. She became Singapore's first female president and the first Malay president in 47 years. In her role, she was also appointed ex officio as chancellor of both the NUS and Nanyang Technological University.

Halimah initially decided to continue living in her public Housing Development Board (HDB) flat in Yishun after being sworn in as president, making her the first president to reside in public housing. Her residence was a duplex consisting of a 5-room and a 4-room flat joined by demolishing the median wall. However, her decision raised security concerns, and on 2 October 2017, the Ministry of Home Affairs announced that, following recommendations from security agencies due to identified threats, she moved to a more secure location. The government continues to oversee her residence and security arrangements.

Halimah made her first state visit as president to Brunei on 11 May 2018, where she witnessed the signing of a financial technology agreement and a memorandum of understanding (MoU) to exchange information related to money laundering and terrorist financing between Singapore and Brunei. At the invitation of King Willem-Alexander of the Netherlands, Halimah was the first president of Singapore to visit the Netherlands since the establishment of diplomatic relations between both countries on 7 December 1965. The visit took place from 20 to 24 November 2018.

To celebrate 50 years of diplomatic ties, Halimah visited the Philippines from 8 to 12 September 2019, where she participated in events in Manila and Davao City, including the Philippines–Singapore Business Council Meeting, a tour of the Philippine Eagle Center, and, on 9 September, oversaw the signing of eight MOUs between Singapore and the Philippines, covering areas such as infrastructure, data protection, water management, and education, alongside Philippine President Rodrigo Duterte. Prior to her visit to Saudi Arabia, Halimah conducted a state visit to Kuwait. Later that same year, she became Singapore's first president to visit Saudi Arabia, where she was conferred the collar of the Order of King Abdulaziz.

In 2023, Halimah conducted several overseas visits, including trips to Malaysia and Qatar. During her visit to Malaysia, she participated in a tree-planting ceremony at Istana Negara, an honour typically reserved for heads of state. On 29 May 2023, Halimah announced that she would not seek re-election in the 2023 presidential election. Her term expired on 13 September, and she was succeeded by the ninth president, Tharman Shanmugaratnam, on 14 September.

=== Advocate for gender equality ===
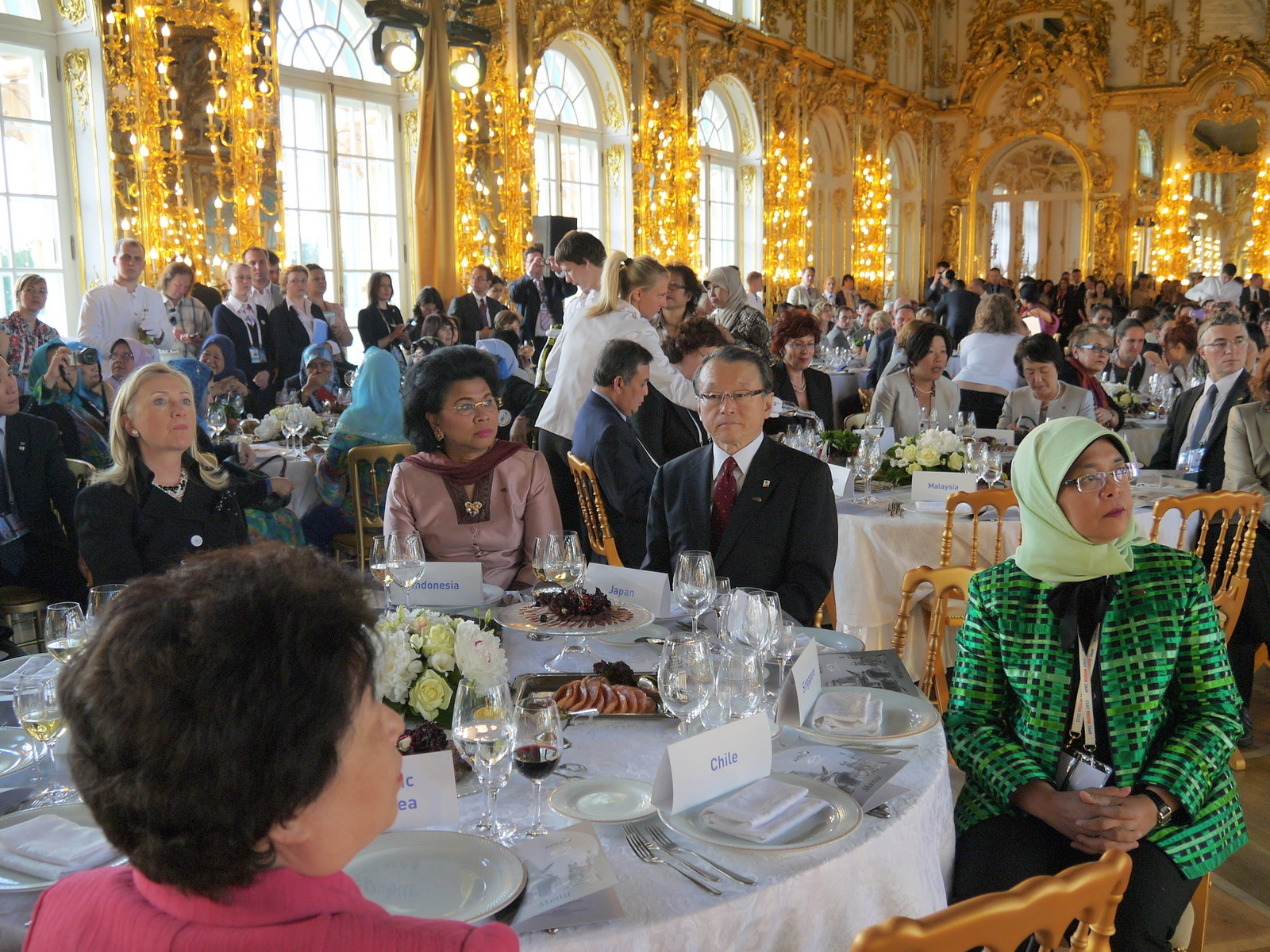
Halimah (right) attending the opening reception of the APEC Women and the Economy Forum 2012 at Catherine Palace

Halimah's difficult upbringing inspired her to get a legal degree and defend the weak, which is why she is an advocate for women's rights. She focused on topics including equitable employment and reasonably priced healthcare when she initially entered politics in 2001 as Singapore's first female Malay MP. She stresses the necessity for ongoing cultural transformation and respect for women as equals, even as she appreciates the advancements made in gender equality. As president, Halimah supported initiatives like the White Paper on Singapore Women's Development to address gender issues. She underscored the need for protections for older workers and advocated for legal reforms to ensure justice for sexual assault victims, arguing that age should not exempt offenders from corporal punishment. Through her work under the President's Challenge, she also focused on empowering disadvantaged groups and promoting religious harmony and multicultural dialogue alongside gender equality.

In 2019, Halimah advocated for companies to embrace gender equality, noting that it will increase innovation and business profitability during her speech at the Women's Forum Asia. She had also publicly voiced her views about a local podcast, OkLetsGo, for their offensive remarks against women and asked the hosts of the show for an apology for their remarks. In order to keep up with workers' concerns, she frequently met with union officials from a variety of industries. Mary Liew, president of NTUC, said that Halimah "always had a heart for women" and was aware of the problems of working moms because she was one herself.

Halimah praised the notable advancements made in women's development in Singapore during her remarks at the 9th Singapore Women Hall of Fame Induction Ceremony. She highlighted the country's improved gender equality ranking and the growing number of women in leadership positions and other fields. While acknowledging the vital roles social service partners play in bolstering these efforts, she underlined the significance of male-female collaborations and called for a concerted effort to dispel gender stereotypes and improve chances for women in the workplace. Eight new inductees were recognised during the event, which highlighted their remarkable accomplishments and experiences and reaffirmed the importance of female role models in motivating the next generation to create a more just society.

=== COVID-19 response ===
In April 2020, in light of the COVID-19 pandemic in Singapore, Halimah approved the government's request to draw $21 billion from the past national reserves, aimed at subsidising wages of 1.9 million workers and preserving jobs and businesses. On 7 April 2020, the Supplementary Supply Bill was revised for the Resilience and Solidarity Budgets and the revised bill was assented by Halimah on 9 April 2020. On 5 June 2020, the Parliament of Singapore passed the Second Supplementary Supply Bill for the Fortitude Budget, to allow for the government to draw an additional of $31 billion from the past reserves, aimed at securing employment for those who lost their jobs due to the pandemic as the country loosens restrictions after the circuit breaker.

On 16 June 2020, Halimah assented to the Second Supplementary Supply Bill, which enacted the Second Supplementary Supply Act, to allow the government the additional requested funds to ease the effects of the pandemic. This marked the second time that the past reserves of Singapore were drawn in the financial year of 2020 and it was also the largest amount drawn from the past reserves since Singapore's independence, with the funds totalling $52 billion. She was the second president to exercise the president's discretionary powers for this purpose, after President S. R. Nathan in 2009 did so for the 2008 financial crisis.

== Post-presidency (2023–present) ==
After her presidency, Halimah became the chancellor of the Singapore University of Social Sciences from 1 October 2023. She became Stephen Lee's successor and was notable for being a SUSS patron.

On 30 August 2024, she replaced Tony Tan as the Securities Investors Association (Singapore)'s new chief patron. She was chosen for this position by the association because of her services to Singapore.

In May 2025, it was reported that Halimah filed a police report in relation to a "deepfake" video in which she was falsely represented to have criticized the Singapore Government.

== Personal life ==
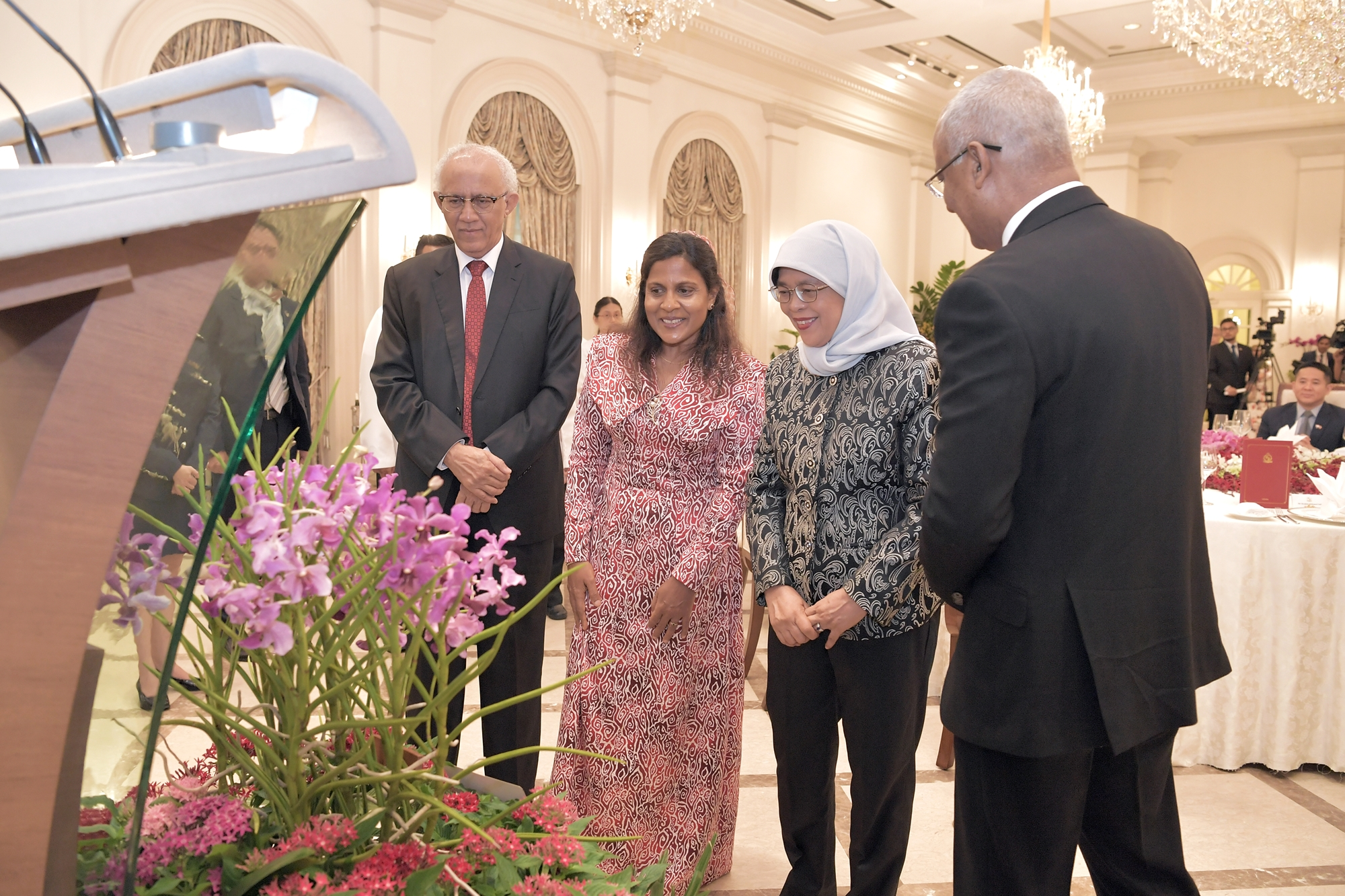
(L–R) Mohammed Abdullah Alhabshee, Fazna Ahmed, Halimah and Ibrahim Mohamed Solih on 1 July 2019

Halimah is married to Mohammed Abdullah Alhabshee, and they have five children. Mohammed graduated from NUS with a Bachelor of Science degree in physics. It was also where he first met Halimah.

Halimah identifies as a Muslim. Although she is categorised as "Indian" on her National Registration Identity Card (NRIC) based on her paternal lineage under the CMIO framework, she ran for the presidential election as a "Malay" and identifies herself as part of the Malay–Muslim community.

== Awards and honours ==
=== Honours ===
On 22 May 2023, President of Kazakhstan Kassym-Jomart Tokayev awarded Halimah the Order of Friendship 1st class. On 29 October 2023, she was awarded the Order of Temasek (with high distinction); her citation stated that she had "served Singapore with distinction over four decades".

National

- Singapore
  - Order of Temasek with High Distinction (29 October 2023)

Foreign

- Saudi Arabia
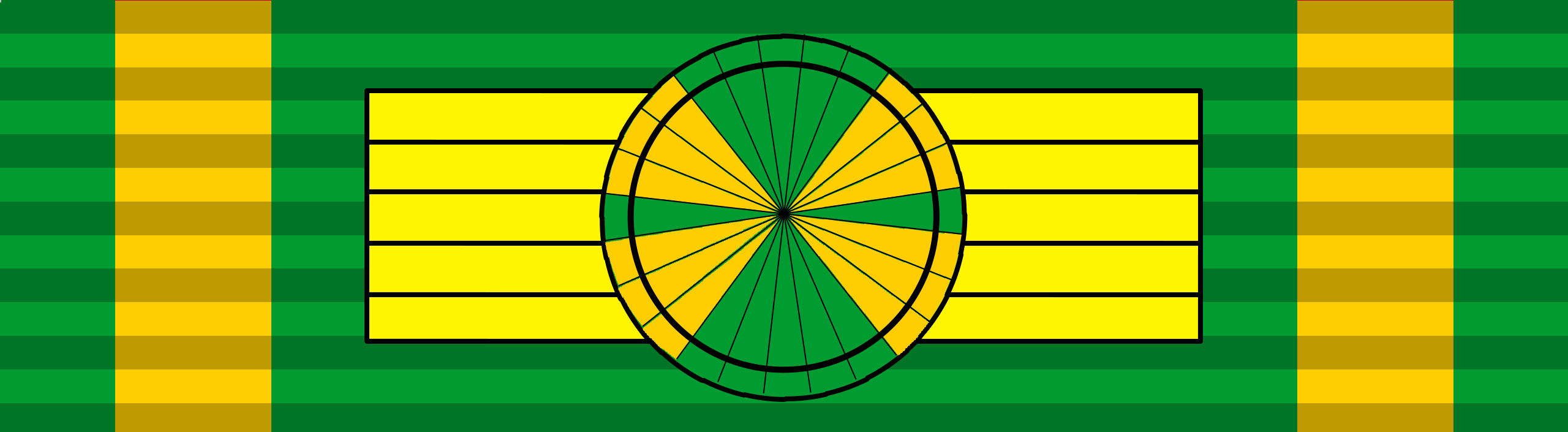
  - Collar of the Order of King Abdulaziz (6 November 2019)
- Kazakhstan
  - Order of Friendship 1st class (22 May 2023)

=== Awards ===
In recognition of her contributions, she was awarded the Berita Harian Achiever of the Year Award in 2001, the Her World Woman of the Year Award in 2003, and the AWARE Heroine Award 2011.

She was also inducted into the Singapore Council of Women's Organisations' Singapore Women's Hall of Fame in 2014. She also received an Honorary Doctor of Laws from the National University of Singapore in 2016.

== Notes ==
Political offices
Preceded by Michael Palmer	Speaker of Parliament; 2013 – 2017	Succeeded by Tan Chuan-Jin
Preceded by Tony Tan Keng Yam	President of Singapore; 2017 – 2023	Succeeded by Tharman Shanmugaratnam
Parliament of Singapore
New constituency	Member of Parliament for Jurong GRC (Bukit Batok East); 2001 – 2015	Succeeded by Rahayu Mahzam
New constituency	Member of Parliament for Marsiling–Yew Tee GRC (Marsiling); 2015 – 2017	Succeeded by Zaqy Mohamad
