= Darjah Utama Temasek =

Civil awards and decorations of Singapore

Darjah Utama Temasek (Order of Temasek)
- Type: Order of Honour
- Established: 1962; 64 years ago
- Country: Singapore
- Eligibility: Singaporeans
- Awarded for: Service
- Status: Active
- Grades: Order of Temasek (With High Distinction); Order of Temasek (With Distinction); Order of Temasek
- Post-nominals: DUT(x)

Precedence
- Next (higher): Bintang Temasek (Note: Only for non-civilians.)
- Next (lower): Darjah Utama Nila Utama
- Ribbon after 1996 Ribbon prior to 1996

The Darjah Utama Temasek (English: Order of Temasek) is Singapore's highest civilian honour and the second most prestigious national honour overall. It was established in 1962 and is an Order conferred by the President of Singapore exclusively to Singaporeans, although it may exceptionally be awarded to foreigners in an honorary capacity.

As of 29 July 2019, the Order is divided into three grades:

- the Order of Temasek (With High Distinction),
- the Order of Temasek (With Distinction), and
- the Order of Temasek.

According to the rules of award, no more than twelve individuals, excluding those admitted in an honorary capacity, may hold the Order of Temasek (With High Distinction, previously known as First Class) at any one time. As of October 2023, nine individuals hold the Order of Temasek (With High Distinction), while there is no cap on the number of recipients in the other two grades.

== History ==
The Order was first instituted in 1962. It was then the most important national honour. The Order would have only twelve members, with Yang di-Pertuan Negara conferring the membership on advice from the Prime Minister. A chancellor would be appointed by the Yang di-Pertuan Negara from among the members of the order, who would hold the seal of the order. Any warrants issued by order would be countersigned by both Chancellor and the Yang di-Pertuan Negara. The Order became the second most important national honour in 1970, when the Bintang Temasek (the Star of Temasek) was created and ranked over all other orders and medals.

The rules governing the order was since revised several times. Gazette notices establishing the Rules that instituted the Order were published in 1975, 1996 and 2019. The 1996 Rules would revoke the 1975 Rules. With the 1996 Rules, there would be three grades of the Order, First Class, Second Class and Third Class. The First Class grade would have a limited capacity of twelve members, whilst the other grades have no such restrictions. The Seal of the Order would bear the design of the Badge.

Members would be distinguished by the positions of the Badge and Star of the Order on their attire. Members of First Class grade would have their Badge worn on the right hip from a sash passing over the left shoulder and under the right arm, and their Star worn on the left side of their outer garment. Members of Second Class grade would have their Badge worn suspended round the neck from a ribbon, and their Star is to be worn on the left side of their outer garment. Members of Third Class grade would only have the Badge of the Order, and it is to be worn suspended round the neck from a ribbon. Ordinarily, only Singaporeans could be admitted to the Order, but in special circumstances foreigners may also be admitted in an honorary capacity.

In 2019, the 1996 Rules was amended to update the nomenclature of the grades of the Order. The grades would be known as:

- the Order of Temasek (With High Distinction),
- the Order of Temasek (With Distinction), and
- the Order of Temasek.

The updated nomenclature would also be retrospectively applied on members conferred under the previous nomenclature.
