= Wee (surname) =

Wee is a surname.

== Origins ==
As a Chinese surname, Wee is an English-language spelling of the pronunciations in different varieties of Chinese of multiple surnames. Those surnames are sorted below by alphabetical order in Hanyu Pinyin, which reflects the standard Mandarin pronunciation:

- Huáng (traditional Chinese: 黃; simplified Chinese: 黄), spelled Wee based on the vernacular reading of Zhangzhou dialect Hokkien pronunciation (Pe̍h-ōe-jī: ûiⁿ). Other English spellings of the Hokkien pronunciation of this surname include Oei, Ooi, and Uy. The spelling Wee is common particularly in Melaka; in contrast, the spelling Ooi is more common in Penang.
- Wèi (Chinese: 魏)

Wee is also a Norwegian surname.

== Statistics ==
Statistics compiled by Patrick Hanks on the basis of the 2011 United Kingdom census and the Census of Ireland 2011 found 150 people on the island of Great Britain and eight on the island of Ireland with the surname Wee. In the 1881 United Kingdom census there were three bearers of the surname. The 2010 United States census found 1,353 people with the surname Wee, making it the 19,865th-most-common surname in the country, representing a slight increase from the 2000 census (1,295 people; 19,355th-most-common). In the 2010 census, roughly 22% of the bearers of the surname identified as non-Hispanic white (down from 29% in the 2000 census), while the number identifying as Asian increased from 62% in the 2000 census to 72% in the 2010 census..

As of 2021, there were 130 people in Norway with the surname Wee.

== People ==
- Adelene Wee (born 1965), Singaporean bowling champion
- Andrew Wee, Singaporean physicist
- Wee Bin (1823–1868), Chinese businessman in Singapore, founder of the shipping company Wee Bin & Co.
- Wee Boon Teck (1850–1888), son of Wee Bin
- Wee Cho Yaw (1929–2024), Singaporean businessman, chairman of United Overseas Bank
- Wee Chong Jin (1917–2005), first Chief Justice of Singapore
- Wee Choo Keong (born 1953), Malaysian politician, MP for Bukit Bintang and later Wangsa Maju, Federal Territories
- Wee Ee Cheong (born 1952/53), Singaporean businessman, CEO of United Overseas Bank
- Wee Han Wen, Malaysian architect
- Wee Jeck Seng (born 1964), Malaysian politician, MP for Tanjong Piai, Johor
- Wee Ka Siong (born 1968), Malaysian politician, MP for Ayer Hitam, Johor
- Wee Kheng Chiang (1890–1978), Sarawak businessman, founder of United Overseas Bank
- Wee Kim Wee (1915–2005), fourth President of Singapore
- Wee Meng Chee (born 1983), Malaysian singer
- Royston Wee (born 1986), Singaporean mixed martial artist
- Sharon Wee (born 1977), Singaporean squash player
- Wee Siew Kim (born 1960), Singaporean politician with the People's Action Party
- Wee Toon Boon (1929–2013), Singaporean politician
- Gulleiv Wee (born 1969), Norwegian bassist
- Jarle Wee (born 1972), Norwegian football striker
- Wolfgang Wee (born 1982), Norwegian podcast host
