= Minh Nguyen (disambiguation) =

Minh Nguyen is a name of Vietnamese origin that may refer to the following Vietnamese Americans:

- Minh Van Nguyen, an American professional poker player
- Minh Nguyen-Vo (1956–), an American film director

The following people also have the family name Nguyễn and given name Minh, although according to Vietnamese custom it is uncommon to omit an individual's middle name:

- Nguyễn Đăng Minh (1623–1696), a Vietnamese mandarin during the Later Lê dynasty warlord period
- Nguyễn Hồng Minh, director of Vietnamese international athletic delegations
- Nguyễn Ngọc Minh (1950–), a deputy in the 11th National Assembly of Vietnam
- Nguyễn Phúc Phương Minh (1949–2012), daughter of Vietnamese emperor Bảo Đại
- Nguyễn Thị Minh (1960–), Vice-Minister of Finance of Vietnam
- Nguyễn Tiến Minh (1983–), a Vietnamese badminton player
- Nguyễn Tuấn Minh (1953–), a deputy in the 11th National Assembly of Vietnam
- Nguyễn Văn Minh, a general in the Army of the Republic of Vietnam (ARVN) during the Vietnam War
- Nguyễn Xuân Minh (1971–), a Vietnamese investor

== See also ==
- Nguyễn Văn Minh (disambiguation)
