= Sat Pal Khattar =

Singaporean lawyer

- Born: November 22, 1942 (age 83); Bhera, Punjab, British India
- Occupations: Lawyer, businessman, community leader
- Spouse: Reeta
- Children: Shareen; Navin; Arvind
- Awards: Padma Shri; NTUC Distinguished Service Award; NTUC Meritorious Service Award; NTUC Distinguished Service Award; NTUC Distinguished Service (Star) Award; Public Administration Medal (Silver); Overseas Indian Award
- Website: Official web site

Sat Pal Khattar is an Indian born Singaporean based lawyer, businessman and community leader, known for his services to the Indian community in Singapore. The Government of India honored Khattar in 2011, with the fourth highest civilian award of Padma Shri, reported to be the first Singaporean to receive the Padma award.

== Biography ==
Sat Pal Khattar was born on 22 November 1942, in a middle class Punjabi family at Bhera, in the present day Pakistan, then the British India. His father had been running a small sports goods business in Singapore and the young Khattar, who lost his mother in childhood, had a difficult childhood due to the pre-independence struggles and partition pangs. It is reported that Khattar and his sister had to spend days at refugee camps before they could reach Delhi before the Indian Independence Day. Soon, he was flown to Singapore to reunite with his family.

Sat Pal Khattar's schooling was at the Raffles Institution, Bras Basah Road, and, as a private candidate, completed A-Level Examinations. Assisting his father in the business and, later, running it on his father's death when he was a second year student, he secured an Honours degree in law from the University of Singapore, in 1966 and started his career as a Deputy Public Prosecutor and State Counsel at the Attorney General's office. This was followed by a shift in job to the Inland Revenue Office as a Legal Officer and, by the time he moved out of IRO, he was a Grade F Senior Legal Officer. During this period, he continued his studies at Singapore University and obtained a master's degree in 1970.

Sat Pal Khattar is married to Reeta and the couple has a daughter and two sons. The eldest, Shareen, is a businessperson, the elder son, Navin a practicing lawyer in UK and the youngest, Arvind, assists his father in business at Khattar Holdings.

== Business career ==
After resigning from Inland Revenue service in 1974, Khattar started a small law firm, Sat Pal Khattar Company. After the initial years, Khattar invited property lawyer, David Wong and expanded the partnership to form Khattar Wong LLP, which, over the years, has grown to become one of the largest law firms in Singapore, employing over 150 lawyers. It is the sole representative of Taxand, the worldwide law consultants and is accredited by the International Tax Review.

Sat Pal Khattar retired from law practice in 2000 and established Khattar Holding, a private investment firm. Since then, he is reported to be active in business investments with interests in India being an investor in the Radisson Hotel in Delhi, Vietnam, Hong Kong, UK and Eastern Europe, in companies such as Gateway Distriparks Ltd, Punjab's Pagro Foods Ltd and India Infoline Ltd. As the chairman of Khattar Holdings, he has made several investments in many businesses. He is a former chairman of Network India and the chairman of First Capital Corporation Ltd and sits on the board of Haw Par Corporation. He is a former chairman of Guocoland Limited, a post he relinquished in 2012.

== Social career ==
Sat Pal Khattar has served on the President's panel for minority rights for more than two decades. He served as the co-chairman of the Singapore India Partnership Foundation and is reported to have participated in the deliberations that led towards the free trade agreement signed between the two countries in 2003.

Khattar has served many civic bodies in Singapore in various capacities. He was the chairman of Singapore Business Federation, the board of governors of Raffles Institution and the Professional Indemnity Insurance Sub-Committee of the Law Society. He was also the director of Singapore Labour Foundation, the president of the Hindu Advisory Board and has served as a member of the Public Service Commission and the Securities Industry Council.

Khattar is a life trustee of the Singapore Indian Development Association (SINDA), a non governmental organization, working for the development of the financially poor members of the Indian community. He is also the vice president of the Singapore Indian Education Trust and a board member of the Institute of South Asian Studies. He is also involved with the International Management Action Award (IMAA) Council as its chairman and the Singapore Indian Chamber of Commerce and Industry, in the role of an advisor.

== Awards and recognitions ==
Sat Pal Khattar is a recipient of the May Day Award on a number of occasions. In 1979, he received the NTUC Distinguished Service Award, followed by the Meritorious Service Award in 1987, the Distinguished Service Award in 1994, and the Distinguished Service (Star) Award in 2001 from the National Trades Union Congress. During his tenure with Inland Revenue Department, he received the Public Administration Medal (Silver) in 1972. He has also received the Overseas Indian Award from Priyadarshini Academy. The Government of India, in 2011, honored Khattar with the civilian award of Padma Shri, making him the first resident from Singapore to be honored by the Indian Government.

== See also ==
- Singapore Indian Development Association
- India–Singapore relations
- Indians in Singapore
