= Wee Cho Yaw =

Singaporean billionaire (1929–2024)

Wee Cho Yaw DUBC BBM
- 黃祖耀
- Born: 10 January 1929; Kinmen, Fujian, Republic of China
- Died: 3 February 2024 (aged 95); Singapore
- Resting place: Kong Meng San Phor Kark See Monastery
- Education: The Chinese High School; Chung Cheng High School
- Occupations: Banker; businessman; investor; philanthropist
- Spouse: Chuang Yong Eng
- Children: 5
- Parent: Wee Kheng Chiang

Wee Cho Yaw
- Traditional Chinese: 黃祖耀
- Simplified Chinese: 黃祖耀
Transcriptions
Standard Mandarin
- Hanyu Pinyin: Huáng Zǔyào
Southern Min
- Hokkien POJ: Ûiⁿ Chó͘-iāu

Wee Cho Yaw DUBC BBM (Chinese: 黃祖耀; pinyin: Huáng Zǔyào; Pe̍h-ōe-jī: Ûiⁿ Chó͘-iāu; 10 January 1929 – 3 February 2024) was a Singaporean banker, businessman, investor, and philanthropist. He was chairman emeritus and honorary adviser of United Overseas Bank (UOB), and chairman of the UOL Group.

Wee joined the board of directors of the United Chinese Bank (now the United Overseas Bank) in 1958. He was appointed managing director of the bank two years later; and when his father Wee Kheng Chiang, founder of United Chinese Bank, retired in 1974, Wee succeeded him as chairman. His son Wee Ee Chong succeeded him as chief executive officer of UOB. He died on 3 February 2024, at the age of 95.

== Early life ==
Wee was born in Kinmen, Fujian, China to Wee Kheng Chiang, a businessman, and Koh Geok Siew, of Jincheng, Kinmen. Koh was the second wife of Keng Chiang with the approval of his first wife. In 1937, Wee and his family fled to Kuching in Borneo to escape the Sino-Japanese War. He lived with the family of his father's first wife for about a year before moving to Singapore, where he attended Gong Shang Primary School and The Chinese High School.

His education was disrupted by the Japanese invasion of Singapore and Malaya, and Wee spent most of the Japanese Occupation with his family in Karimun in Indonesia. After the Japanese Occupation, Wee returned to Singapore and attended Chung Cheng High School. There he was involved in anti-colonial politics, and was investigated by the British authorities before his father then pulled him out of school.

== Career ==
=== Early career ===
In 1949, Wee started work at Kheng Leong, a business owned by his family that traded commodities such as rubber, pepper and sago flour. He stayed close to his father and learned the ways of business, taking on his millionaire father's wide range of contacts and connections. In 1958, Wee became the youngest director on the board of United Chinese Bank (UCB), which his father had founded in 1935. He then spent several months attached to a British bank in London to study its operations, before returning to work in UCB.

=== United Chinese Bank ===
In 1960, Wee Kheng Chiang stepped down as managing director of UCB (while remaining as chairman), and Wee took over the post from 1 July. The bank had previously dealt only with local businesses, but Wee moved the bank into foreign exchange and international trade financing. In 1964, UCB applied to open a branch in Hong Kong, and was renamed United Overseas Bank (UOB) from January 1965 to avoid a clash of names with an existing bank there. By this time, Wee had grown the bank's trade financing business more than a hundredfold from before he took control of its operations. He had also raised its authorised capital and issued capital, grown its loans business and enlarged its assets nearly ninefold.

=== Growth of UOB ===
Under Wee's direction, UOB expanded its branch network in Singapore and internationally, and further diversified into the finance business, property, insurance, realty, trustee and executor services, lease financing and merchant banking. The bank went public in 1970, and Wee was appointed vice-chairman a year later. In June 1971, UOB acquired 49.8% of the Chung Khiaw Bank, and Wee made the newspaper headlines for sealing the deal for a bank that at the time had a larger asset base and a larger network of branches. The S$22 million deal saw UOB beat more than six rivals to the deal and doubled UOB's size, creating the second largest banking group in Singapore and Malaysia. Wee later named the Chung Khiaw deal as one of his most important, as it marked UOB's take-off into the wider Asian market.

In 1972, UOB was listed on the Hong Kong exchange and acquired Lee Wah Bank. Two years later, when his father retired as chairman of UOB, Wee was his successor. By the end of the 1970s, Wee was also chairman of Haw Par Brothers International and the Chinese newspaper Sin Chew Jit Poh, and sat on the boards of the Development Bank of Singapore (DBS), Sime Darby and Straits Steamship Company.

The UOB group continued to grow in the 1980s, acquiring Far Eastern Bank and the Industrial and Commercial Bank. Wee took UOB into stockbroking, fund management and futures trading, and acquired property including hotels and shopping malls. The Business Times named Wee Singapore's Businessman of the Year for 1990 and again in 2001, and the ASEAN Business Forum named him its ASEAN Businessman of the Year in 1995.

While a critic of the government's plan to liberalise Singapore's banking sector and allow foreign banks more market access in the 1990s, Wee restructured UOB's operations to meet the increased competition and to continue the bank's expansion in the region.

In June 2001, UOB acquired the Overseas Union Bank (OUB) in a S$10 billion cash-and-shares deal. Wee was credited with a surer grasp of local business culture that allowed him to edge out the government-linked DBS, which also sought to acquire OUB. A day after DBS's unsolicited bid for OUB, Wee visited OUB founder Lien Ying Chow and was able to convince the Lien family to sell their stakes to UOB. Wee later said in an interview that he would have bid for OUB regardless of Lien's response, as the acquisition was vital to the survival of UOB.

=== Challenges and succession ===
In the mid-2000s, Wee faced a challenge to maintain his family's control over various companies in the UOB group amid a restructuring of the companies’ interlocking shareholdings. This situation arose after the government mandated that banks would have to reduce their shareholdings in non-core businesses to stipulated levels. As companies such as United Overseas Land (UOL), Overseas Union Enterprise (OUE), United Industrial Corporation (UIC) and Haw Par Corporation held stakes in UOB and vice versa, the loss of any one would weaken the Wee family's control of the group and even the core business of UOB. Wee however managed to fend off a bid for UOL from government investment company Temasek Holdings as well as maintain control of UIC, after Filipino billionaire John Gokongwei’s failed takeover attempt.

In November 2006, Wee received the inaugural Credit Suisse-Ernst & Young Lifetime Achievement Award for his pioneering work in Singapore's financial industry. A newspaper report then named him the best paid local banking executive, with a remuneration of between S$9 million and S$9.25 million in 2006.

At UOB's 65th annual meeting in April 2007, Wee stepped down as the bank's chief executive officer and was succeeded by his eldest son Ee Cheong. He remained as chairman of UOB, which he had grown into Singapore's largest bank by market capitalisation with more than 500 branches and offices in 18 countries.

In 2017, it was announced that Wee will step down from UOB in April 2018 but remained as chairman emeritus and honorary adviser to the board.

As of May 2021, Wee's net worth was estimated at US$9.47 Billion by Bloomberg Billionaires Index, making him one of the richest persons in Singapore.

== Personal life ==
Wee had three sons and two daughters.

== Affiliations ==
In 1969, Wee was appointed to the Economic Development Board and the Currency Board, and as chairman of the Singapore Science Centre board the following year. He was elected as the first president of the Singapore Chinese Chamber of Commerce (later Singapore Chinese Chamber of Commerce and Industry (SCCCI)) in 1971 and served for two separate terms.

He was honorary president at SCCCI.

In 1972, he was head and spokesman of the ASEAN Chambers of Commerce and Industry. Wee also headed the Hokkien Huay Kuan (clan association) from 1972 to 2010, and was founding president of the Singapore Federation of Chinese Clan Associations (SFCCA), an umbrella group for 190 associations, from 1985 to 2010.

Wee was also a prime mover in the formation of the Chinese Development Assistance Council (CDAC) in 1992 and became chairman of its board of trustees.

== Philanthropy ==
Wee had been appointed chairman of the Nanyang University council in 1970, and he led efforts to modernise the university by updating its curriculum and establishing English as its medium of instruction. After the government merged Nanyang with the University of Singapore in 1980, Wee was appointed to the council of the newly formed National University of Singapore. In 2004, he became pro-chancellor of the Nanyang Technological University (NTU).

In February 2009, the Wee Foundation was set up with an initial S$30 million endowment from the Wee family. The charitable foundation focuses on education and welfare for the underprivileged, and also promotes the Chinese language and culture as well as social integration.

=== Education ===
Wee was the chairman of the joint School Management Committee for Chung Cheng High School (Main), Chung Cheng High School (Yishun) and Nanyang Junior College. He also held chairmanship of Singapore Hokkien Huay Kuan.

== Recognition ==
In 1971, the Singapore government awarded him the Bintang Bakti Masyarakat (Public Service Star), and he was named Singapore Businessman of the Year in 1990 and 2001.

In 2006, for his contributions to the banking sector, he was presented with the inaugural Credit Suisse-Ernst & Young Lifetime Achievement Award. Wee received an honorary doctorate from the National University of Singapore in July 2008.

In 2009, for his contributions to the banking industry and broader community, Wee was awarded The Asian Banker Lifetime Achievement Award.

In 2011, Forbes listed him as Singapore's wealthiest individual with a net worth of S$4.2 billion. Wee received the Darjah Utama Bakti Cemerlang (Distinguished Service Order) in recognition of his work with the SFCCA and as pro-chancellor of NTU.
