= Nguyen Xuan Minh =

Vietnamese banker

- Born: February 3, 1971 (age 54); Hanoi, Vietnam
- Occupation(s): Banker, business executive
- Known for: Developing Techcom Securities through financial technology development as a major Vietnamese investment firm

Nguyễn Xuân Minh is a Vietnamese business executive who is the Executive Chairman of Techcom Securities, a subsidiary of Techcombank, a leading bank in Vietnam.

Techcom Securities (TCBS) is the leading wealthtech company and is the largest securities company in Vietnam in terms of profit and brand value. TCBS helps domestic companies raise in aggregate more than U$3 billion per year via Debt and Equity Capital Markets in Vietnam. It also has more than 80% market share in trading of local listed corporate bonds in Vietnam. Consecutively, Techcom Securities was named the Best Bond House in Vietnam for 2007–2016, 2008–2017 and 2009–2018 by Alpha Southeast Asia and the Best Debt Capital Markets House for 2017, 2018 and 2019 in Vietnam by FinanceAsia.

Prior to joining Techcom Securities, Minh founded Vietnam Asset Management (VAM) in 2007. He was VAM's CEO & CIO and subsequently became its chairman. Minh is also chairman of the board of Techcom Bond Fund, the largest local mutual fund in Vietnam with over 90% market share in local fixed income fund market in Vietnam and represents more than 50% share of Vietnam's total local fund industry. He is also an Independent Board Director of Vietnam Airlines, the national airline of Vietnam. Minh has also held positions as a board director for several Vietnamese public and private companies.

== Early years and education ==
Minh was born on February 3, 1971, in Hanoi, Vietnam, during the peak of the Vietnam War. In 1976 after the end of the war, Minh's parents moved the family back to their home town of Ho Chi Minh City. Minh's most notable childhood achievements include winning the Gold Medal for Ho Chi Minh City Judo Championship and the First Prize in Physics – Ho Chi Minh City's High School Competition, both in 1986. From 1986 to 1988, Minh studied in the gifted class on Math and Physics at Thanh My Tay High School (current name: Gia Dinh) in Ho Chi Minh City. During this time, he was taught by two well-known teachers: Mr. Le Quang Anh (teacher in mathematics) and Mr. Le Quang Diem (teacher in physics).

In 1989, Minh became one of about 200 top students who received full government scholarships to study abroad. He went to the Soviet Union to study at the Azerbaijan State Oil Academy, Baku, Azerbaijan, then subsequently at the Gubkin Russian State University of Oil and Gas, Moscow, Russia and received a Master of Science degree in oil & gas – mechanical engineering in 1994. Soon after, Minh received another Master's degree in applied finance and investment from FINSIA in Australia. In addition, Minh received his CFA charter as a Chartered Financial Analyst in 2003. He is also a member of various professional and business associations in Vietnam and overseas. Minh is a licensed fund manager in Vietnam. Minh speaks Vietnamese, English and Russian. Minh lives in Hanoi.

== Career ==
Minh joined Franklin Templeton Investments under Dr. Mark Mobius's Global Emerging Market Group in 1997. He started as an investment analyst, and subsequently the Chief of Templeton's Vietnam representative office. Minh was relocated to Singapore one year later, where he was eventually promoted to the position of senior vice president.

In 2005, Minh was co-managing two of Templeton's Asian equity funds, whose yearly performance ranked 2nd and 8th amongst a large peer group of managed Asian investment funds according to Micropal and Lipper. Near the end of 2006, Minh left Templeton to co-found Vietnam Asset Management (VAM) to take advantage of the investment potential offered as a result of Vietnam's booming economic growth. Under Minh's leadership as CEO & CIO, VAM-managed Vietnam equity funds consistently outperformed the benchmark VN-Index and several other peers by a significant margin throughout the years.

Subsequently, UOB-Kay Hian and Dubai Investment Group invested in VAM as strategic investors. VAM also managed various offshore funds to invest in Vietnam and also partnered with various financial institutions in Asia such as Hong Leong Bank of Malaysia, H.S. Securities of Japan, and UOBAM of Singapore to manage Vietnam funds.

In October 2013, Minh joined Techcom Securities as its Executive Chairman. Within two years, Minh helped transform Techcom Securities from a relatively unknown brokerage house to the second largest securities institution in Vietnam. Under Minh's leadership, Techcom Securities subsequently became the largest and most profitable investment banking institution in 2019, achieved all targets of its first 5-year strategy in 2020 and hit a market capitalization of $1 billion. In 2021, Techcom Securities upheld its No. 1 position in the bond brokerage market for the sixth year. It also has No.1 brand value among its peers, No.1 in fund distribution, Top 4 in securities brokerage, and Top 3 in margin lending when compared to over 70 competitors in Vietnam.

For many years, Techcom Securities has received a number of awards granted by regional financial publications. Techcom Securities’ vision is to become the dominant Fintech leader in investment banking business in Vietnam by 2025.

== Journey to Fintech ==
Minh's first exposure to fintech was during his final year in university in Russia when he learned about and became interested in the stock market. Equipped with a quantitative-focused Master's degree in Mechanical Engineering at Gubkin Russian State University of Oil and Gas, Minh went to Australia to pursue a Master's Degree in Applied Finance and Investment at FINSIA. Minh returned to Vietnam in 1996 to pursue a career in finance and investment.

Being a technology enthusiast with a strong and innovative mind early in his career, Minh already established a strong track records in building fintech systems and platforms, such as Investment-analysis Emerging Market Database at Franklin Templeton and Company Analysis System at Vietnam Asset Management. At Techcom Securities, Minh continued to implement a wide range of technology applications into business. With a wealthtech-focused strategy, the number of personnel at Techcom Securities increased 165 times from a team of only 30 people in 2013 to over 500 people, more than 65% of which is IT personnel and operates under Scrum/Agile model.

Minh also successfully built many technological applications and system initiatives for Techcom Securities, such as building TCInvest - the first online asset management and investment platform in Vietnam, launching the first Vietnamese social investing platform iCopy, pioneering the launch of 100% online account opening & eKYC service.

The launch of 100% online account opening service at Techcom Securities during the COVID-19 pandemic successfully helped the number of new customers opening new accounts at TCBS increase by 60%, adding 107,000 customers by 2020 and accounting for 27% of the market. Moreover, Techcom Securities is proud to be the first to bring to the Vietnamese market the Robo Advisor model - a TCWealth accumulation investment advisory tool that automates the long-term financial planning process and allocating portfolios according to needs. With a technology-oriented approach, Techcom Securities also stands out from other competitors by moving to cloud. In 2022, TCBS pioneers the use of blockchain technology in corporate bonds and plans to institutionalize blockchain within all departments of the company. Over the years, Techcom Securities has consistently made breakthroughs in digitalization and stayed at the forefront of technology compared to other competitors by concentrating on the niche market while constantly integrating technology in management and operational systems.

Emerging from the pandemic, TCBS's efforts in developing and leading technology innovation were recognized by publications. Under Minh's leadership, Techcom Securities is establishing itself as a leading financial technology company in the region by continuing to perfect its Wealthtech ecosystem.

== Press contributions ==
Minh is a regular contributor to Forbes, CNBC Asia, Bloomberg, the Saigon Times Daily, and various other local and international media outlets to discuss issues concerning Vietnam's financial markets.

In October 2009, Minh was the keynote speaker in Kuala Lumpur as part of HLG Unit Trust's 'Invest in Vietnam' Campaign. In the June 2011 edition of the Financial & Business News Channel, Minh gave an interview on the prospect of open-ended funds in Vietnam.
