= CDAC =

CDAC may refer to:

- Commission on Dental Accreditation of Canada
- Communicating with Disaster Affected Communities Network
- Canadian American Railroad
- Centre for Development of Advanced Computing
- Chinese Development Assistance Council, a self-help and non-profit organization set up by the Chinese community in Singapore to help the lower-income group and academically-weak students
