= Vietnam Asset Management =

Vietnamese fund management company

Vietnam Asset Management (VAM)
- Company type: Limited liability
- Industry: Asset management
- Founded: 2006
- Headquarters: Ho Chi Minh City, Vietnam
- Products: Closed-end Vietnam equity funds Open-end Vietnam equity funds Open-end Vietnam equity unit trusts Private managed accounts Direct/co-investments
- Number of employees: 15
- Website: www.vietnamam.com

Vietnam Asset Management (VAM) is a fund management company founded in 2006 by John Lyn (executive chairman), Nguyễn Xuân Minh (chief executive officer/chief investment officer) and Nguyen Hoai Thu (investment director/head of research). They are currently key managers of VAM. VAM is domiciled in the British Virgin Islands, the United Kingdom as a limited liability company. VAM has a liaison office in Singapore and a representative office in Ho Chi Minh City, Vietnam.

VAM is a company that primarily engages in public and private equity investment and advisory services in Vietnam. VAM manages Vietnam equity dedicated closed-end funds, open-end Vietnam equity funds, and unit trusts which are offered to investors, both institutional and individual, in Europe, Dubai, Japan, Singapore, Malaysia, etc. In addition, VAM also provides financial advisory services to Vietnamese enterprises and investment advisory services to global investors who want to invest in Vietnam equity market.

In September 2007, UOB-Kay Hian and Dubai Investment Group, a Dubai Holding company, bought strategic stakes in VAM and appointed their senior executives to sit in VAM's board of directors. Concurrently, they invested into one of VAM's closed-end funds. In 2008 and 2009, VAM launched in cooperation with HLG Asset Management of Malaysia, a Hong Leong Group company, two Vietnam equity dedicated open-end unit trusts, the Hong Leong Vietnam Fund and the Hong Leong Vietnam Strategic Fund, for Malaysian investors. In 2008, VAM was the first Vietnam fund manager to launch a Vietnam Index Linked Fund, which it distributes in cooperation with H.S. Securities of Japan.

== Funds under management ==
- Vietnam Emerging Market Fund, Ltd. (VEMF) - Launched in February 2007, this Cayman Islands domiciled closed-end fund focuses on private and public equity investments in private equity, privatization, IPO, OTC, and listed markets in Vietnam. VEMF was converted into an open-end fund in May 2010. The fund is offered to eligible global investors.
- VAM Vietnam Strategic Fund, Ltd. (VVSF) - Launched in October 2007, this Cayman Islands domiciled closed-end fund focuses on private and public equity investments in private equity, privatization, IPO, OTC, and listed markets in Vietnam.
- Hong Leong Vietnam Fund (HLVF) - Launched in February 2008, this Malaysian domiciled unit trust focuses on private and public equity investments in private equity, privatization, IPO, OTC, and listed markets in Vietnam. The fund is managed in cooperation with Hong Leong Asset Management targeting Malaysian high-net-worth investors.
- HS-VAM Vietnam Index Linked Fund (VILF) - Launched in August 2008, this Cayman Islands domiciled unit trust is designed to track a composite of Vietnamese blue-chip listed equities in both the Ho Chi Minh Stock Exchange and the Hanoi Stock Exchange. The fund is offered to Japanese retail investors with the cooperation of H.S. Securities of Japan.
- Hong Leong Vietnam Strategic Fund (HLSF) - Launched in April 2010, this Malaysian domiciled unit trust focuses on private and public equity investments in private equity, privatization, IPO, OTC, and listed markets in Vietnam. The fund is managed in cooperation with Hong Leong Asset Management targeting Malaysian public retail investors.
