= Singapore Federation of Chinese Clan Associations =

Community organisation in Singapore

The Singapore Federation of Chinese Clan Associations (traditional Chinese: 新加坡宗鄕會館聯合總會; simplified Chinese: 新加坡宗乡会馆联合总会; pinyin: Xīnjiāpō Zōngxiāng Hùiguǎn Liánhé Zǒnghùi; SFCCA) is an umbrella organisation for ethnic Chinese clan associations in Singapore.

== History ==
Chinese kinship organisations, also known as clan associations, were historically important to ethnic Chinese immigrant communities in Southeast Asia, including in Singapore. They provided services such as social welfare, religious observances, education, and mediation to their members, who typically belonged to the same lineage, ancestral district, or dialect group. However, by the 1980s, memberships of Chinese clan associations in Singapore were declining and ageing, and many of their social welfare functions were now provided by the state.

The SFCCA had its origins in a public forum organised by eight major clan associations in 1984 to discuss the revitalisation of clan associations. Then-Deputy Prime Minister Ong Teng Cheong participated in this meeting and endorsed the associations' plans. Registration was granted by the Singapore Registry of Societies on 12 December 1985, and the Federation was inaugurated on 27 January 1986. The founding members were the Singapore Hokkien Huay Kuan, Teo Chew Poit Ip Huay Kuan, Singapore Kwangtung Hui Kuan, Nanyang Khek Community Guild, Singapore Hainan Hwee Kuan, Sam Kiang Huay Kwan, and Singapore Foochow Association. A total of 185 associations, comprising most of the clan associations in Singapore, joined the SFCCA.

The first head of the SFCCA was the banker Wee Cho Yaw, who also chaired the Singapore Hokkien Huay Kuan. He was succeeded by Chua Thian Poh in October 2010. The current President is Thomas Chua Kee Seng. The SFCCA was originally based at the Hokkien Huay Kuan building. It moved to its current headquarters in the former premises of the Heng A Khe Bong School at 397 Lorong 2 Toa Payoh in 1997.

== Activities ==
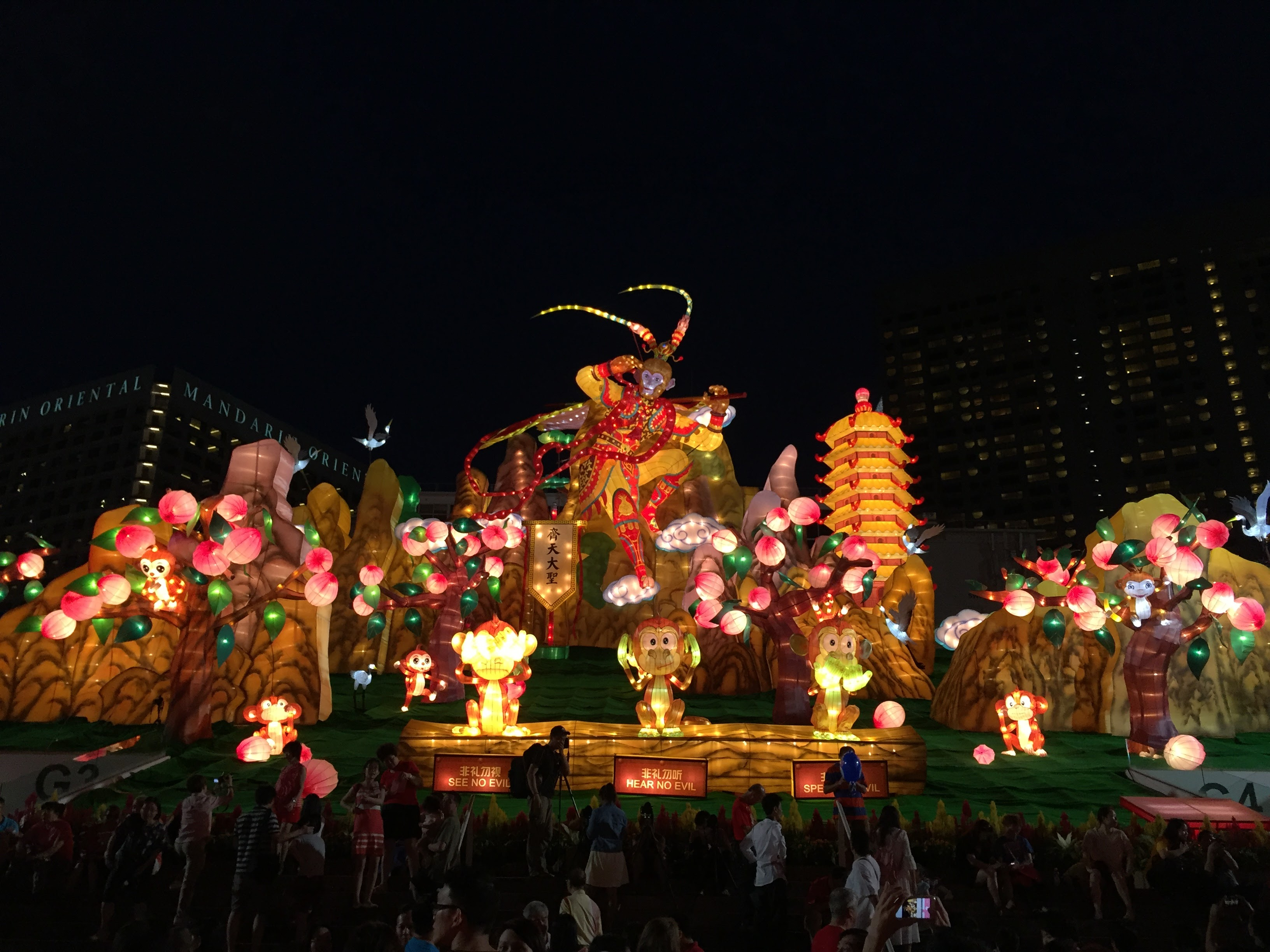
Decorations during the 2016 River Hongbao Festival organised by the SFCCA

The SFCCA supports the activities of clan associations, and organises cultural and educational activities such as the River Hongbao Festival to celebrate the lunar new year. It sponsors a scholarship for students from Singapore to study at universities in China, and jointly sponsors a bursary with the Chinese Development Assistance Council for students in Singapore. The SFCCA publishes a bimonthly magazine, Yuan (《原》), and sponsors publications on Chinese culture and history, such as A General History of the Chinese in Singapore (2015). The Chinese Heritage Centre, a research centre based in Nanyang Technological University, was opened by the SFCCA in 1995. In 2013, the SFCCA incorporated the Singapore Chinese Cultural Centre to serve as a venue for cultural activities; the Centre's building located in downtown Singapore was opened in 2017.

The SFCCA has acted as an intermediary between the Chinese community and the state by supporting government policies on potentially divisive issues, such as the promotion of Mandarin over other Chinese dialects, and the implementation of English as the main language of instruction in schools where Chinese had formerly been used. During the Asian values debate of the 1980s and 1990s, the government in turn saw the clan associations as allies in promoting traditional values and preventing the incursion of Western values.
