= Goh Siew Tin =

Goh Siew Tin (1854 - 16 January 1909), alias Goh Tat Pang, was a prominent Chinese merchant. He was the first president of the Singapore Chinese Chamber of Commerce, and was known as the founder of Batu Pahat, Johor.

== Biography ==
Goh was born in 1854 to Goh Siew Swee, who owned the firm chop Ban Ann, which engaged in the sawmill and tin mining industry, and imported and exported local products between Singapore, the Dutch East Indies, and the Malay Peninsula. Following his father's death in 1892, Goh overtook the business, renaming it as chop Ann Ho, and traded largely with Java. In 1898, Goh was appointed as a committee member of the Singapore Po Leung Kuk. In 1906, he and several fellow prominent members of the Chinese community in Singapore founded the General Chinese Trade Affairs Association (later known as Singapore Chinese Chamber of Commerce), becoming the Association's first president, the vice-president in 1907, and the president again in 1908.

In 1906, he founded Tao Nan School, and first chairman of the founding school board. He once dispatched headmaster Ma Zhengxiang to lead a group of students in Nanjing Jinan School in China.

Goh was also known as the founder of Batu Pahat, Johor.

== Personal life ==
Goh died on 16 January 1909. His funeral was held on 3 March, and his remains were removed from his shop and brought to Tanjong Pagar Wharf to be brought to China. On the day of the funeral, all of the shops that traded in Javanese produce were closed. Students of the Tao Nan School attended his funeral. Following his death, his business came under the management of his son, Goh Eng Loon.
