= Singapore Indian Development Association =

Community organisation in Singapore

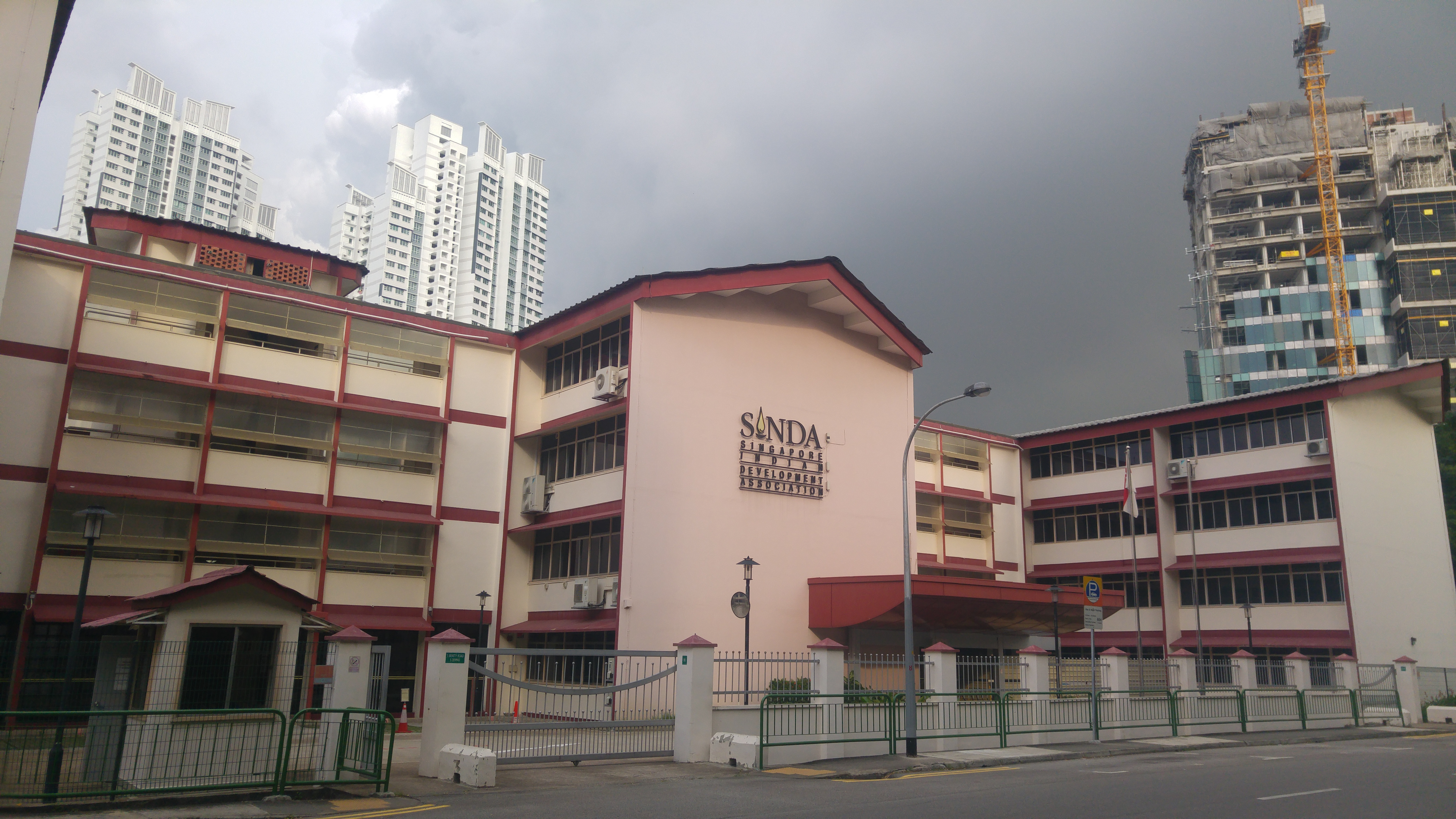
The SINDA Headquarters at 1 Beatty Road

The Singapore Indian Development Association (SINDA) is a charity for the Singaporean Indian community. Set up to focus on educational and socio-economic matters, its mission is to “build a well-educated, resilient and confident community of Indians that stands together with other communities in contributing to the progress of multi-racial Singapore”.

SINDA is one of four "self-help groups" available for each ethnic community in Singapore — which also include the Chinese Development Assistance Council, Eurasian Association and Yayasan Mendaki — which provide a variety of programmes and services to assist its community. It is the only SHG to have its own family service centre, which assists communities on interpersonal and family-related issues.

SINDA's programmes revolve primarily around the themes of education, youth, family and children, social and financial assistance, and community.

== SINDA Subsidy ==
All of SINDA’s programmes are heavily subsidised or provided at no cost to Singaporean Indians. From January 2024, the criteria were:

Family Per Capita income	Subsidy
Up to $1,600	No Fees
Above $1,600	Commitment Fee ($10 per programme)
Non-Citizens and Non-Permanent Residents	Full programme cost will be payable

Family Per Capita Income (PCI) refers to the total monthly nett monthly household income divided by the number of members living in the household. PCI is used by SINDA to assess the eligibility of individuals and families for financial assistance and programme fee subsidies.

== History ==
=== Before 2000 ===
1990: Then Director of Welfare at the Ministry of Community Development, K V Veloo, recognised the social obstacles faced by sectors of the Indian community. Alongside S. Vasoo and S. Chandra Das, they formed the Singapore Indian Welfare Association (SIWA) to help Indian individuals and families sort out their social difficulties. It was later renamed to SINDA, or Singapore Indian Development Association, with E Sukumar announced as the president.

1991: The Action Committee on Indian Education (ACIE), chaired by J Y Pillay, highlighted the educational under-performance of Indian students and recommended wide-ranging remedial measures. Several courses of action were proposed and one of them was to have SINDA operate on two fronts; the Education Wing, aimed at Indian students and their parents, and the Welfare Wing, which would focus on reinforcing healthy and happy family relationships. The new SINDA came into effect in August 1991, with S Iswaran as Chief Executive Officer.

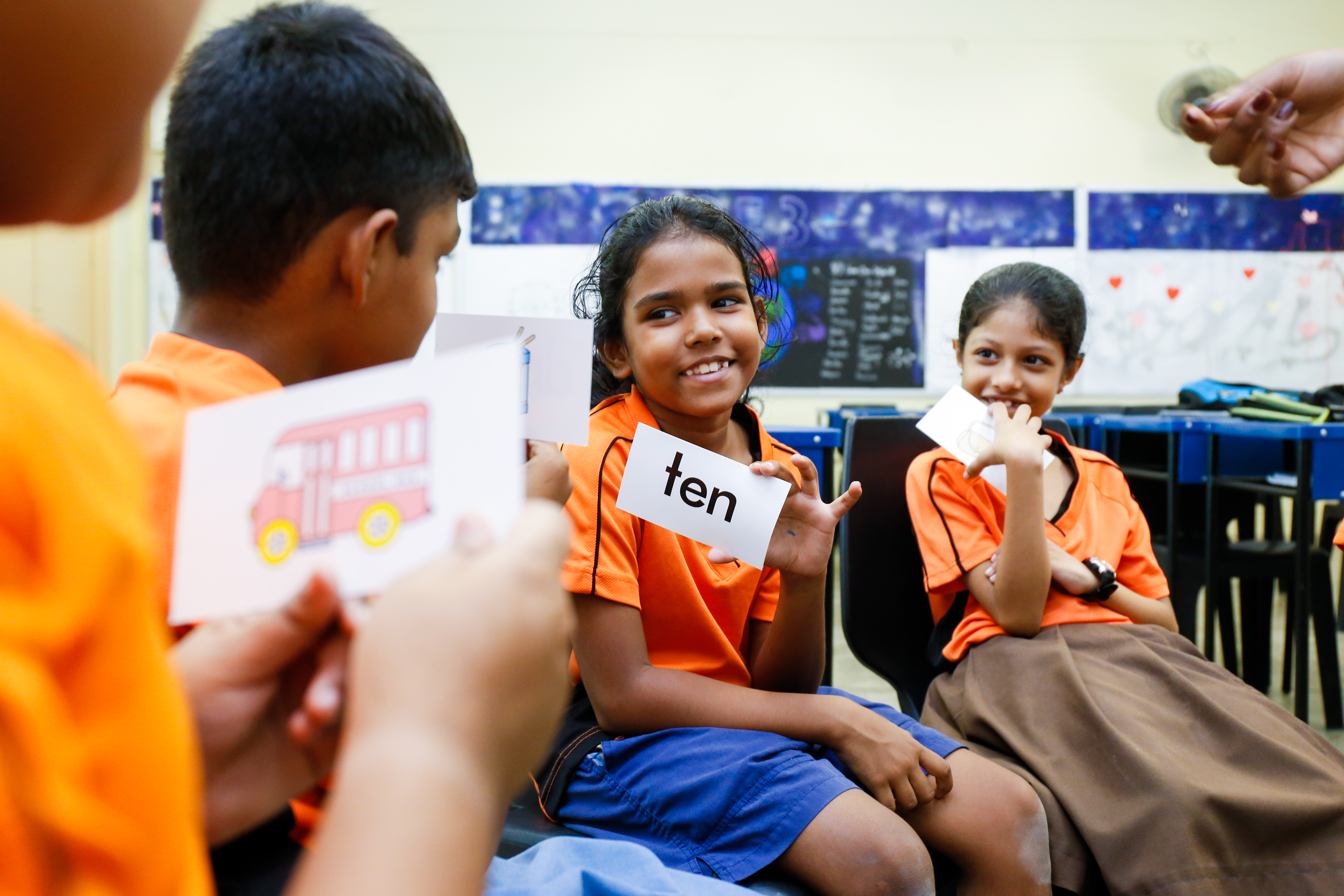
Since inception in 1992, STEP has been conducted across centres situated in MOE schools islandwide.

1992: SINDA Tutorials for Enhanced Performance (STEP) was launched and by March, 2,600 students had enrolled in the programme through referrals of educators and parents. STEP centres were made more accessible, fees affordable, class sizes kept small and trainings for tutors were enhanced.

1996: The Youth Development Wing was initiated to develop, engage and motivate Indian youth, in activities such as holiday enrichment programmes like camps and community service.

=== 2000 – 2010 ===
By the 2000s, in tandem with evolving trends, SINDA diversified its programmes and services – counselling, talks and workshops on parenting, student mentoring and IT training were provided. SINDA strengthened its relationships with community partners, and groups such as community centres, Indian Activity Executive Committees (IAECs), Indian organisations and religious organisations.

New programmes were introduced and collaborations with the community increased as well, stemming from heightened networking and the collective interest of working towards uplifting the Indian community in Singapore – Project Give was launched, Teach programme was introduced to help weak students, Project Athena to empower single Indian mothers to become confident and independent and the Back To School Festival, which allows students to receive stationery and shoe vouchers for the new school year.

SINDA also launched its newsletter, SINDA Connections in 2008 and today, it is circulated to some 62,000 Indian households and community organisations to keep them updated on SINDA news.

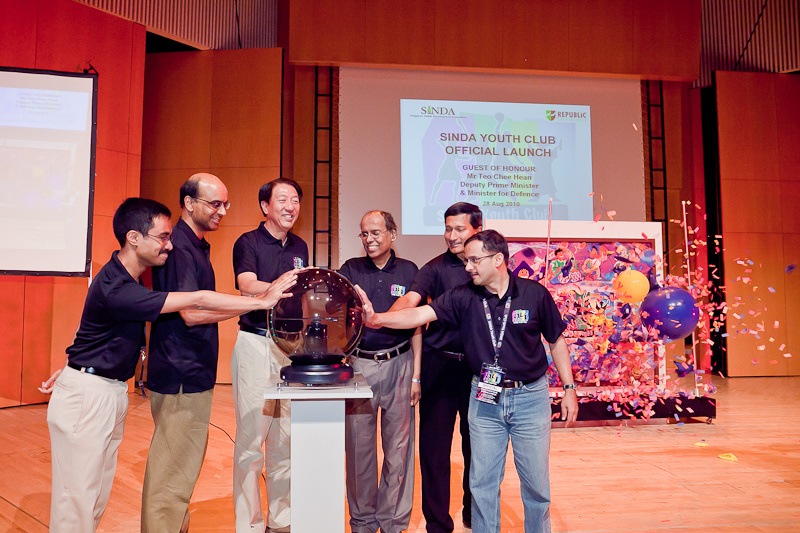
In 2010, then Deputy Prime Minister & Minister for Defence, Teo Chee Hean was the Guest of Honour for the official launch of SINDA Youth Club.

In 2010, the SINDA Youth Club (SYC) was established, targeting at 18 to 35 year olds. SYC’s aim is to nurture generations of Indian leaders with a passion for community building and social leadership.

=== 2011 to Present ===
In 2011, as part of its 20th anniversary, SINDA launched the SINDA 2020 review to gauge how far the community had come and the progress still required. The review resulted in the “SINDA 2020: A New Momentum” report, which recommended key strategies for SINDA to focus on.

Following this report, SINDA restructured its goals by increasing the capacity and impact of existing programmes to improve its services to the community. While signature programmes and events continued to run, new and improved programmes that cater to the evolving needs of the community were piloted and subsequently implemented.

Devising a new strategy for outreach – called the “Flipped-model” was one of the enhancements SINDA made to engage the community more effectively. In doing so, SINDA actively reached out to its target audience to forge stronger connections and understand ground issues better.

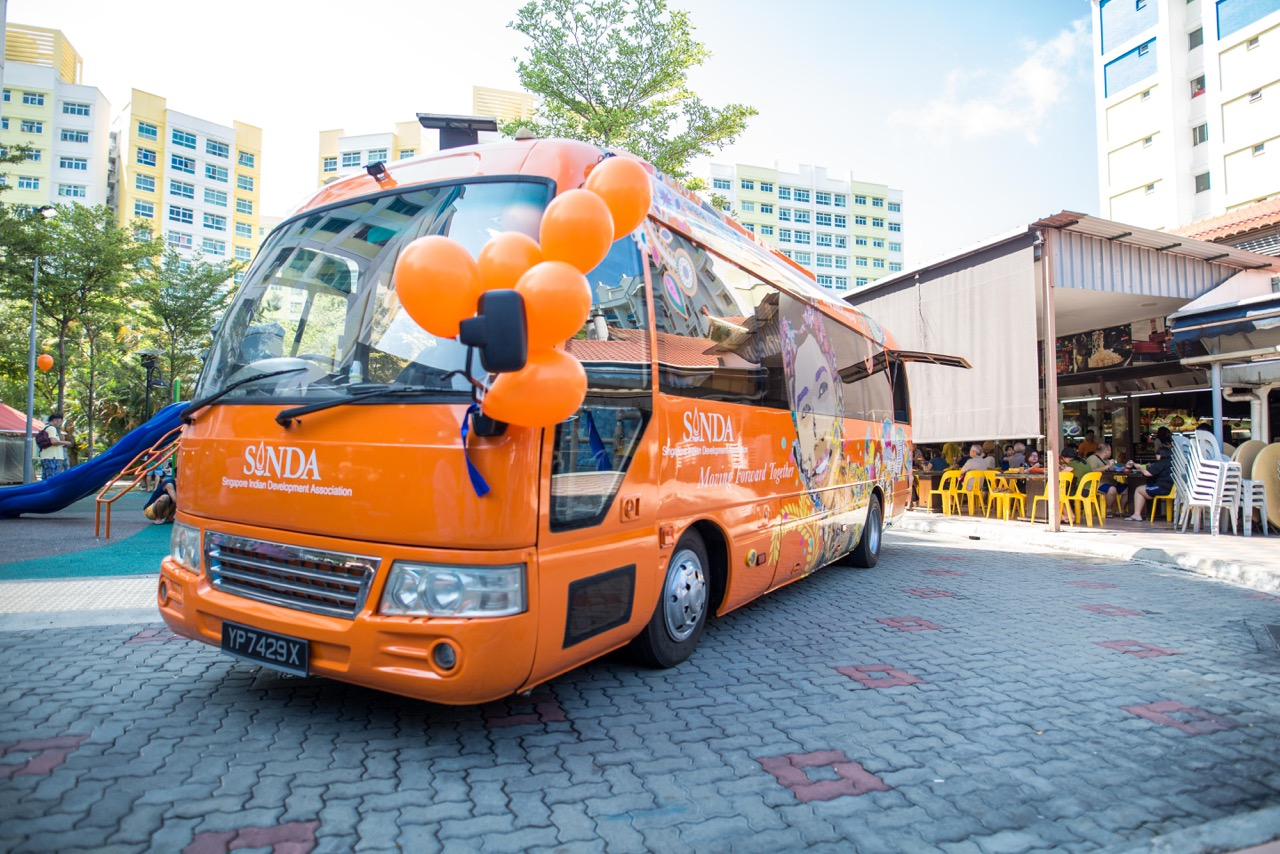
In 2018, SINDA launched the SINDA Bus

For instance, the Door Knocking Exercise, targeted at specific neighbourhoods with higher concentration of low-income Indian families, was piloted 2016. In 2017, it was introduced as a new programme that helped SINDA connect better with Indian heart landers and tend to their needs and concerns. 2016 was also the year that the Prisons Outreach programme was piloted, through which SINDA provided family assistance to inmates’ families who required help during the inmates’ incarceration. 2018 saw the launch of the SINDA Bus which serves as a mobile satellite centre to extend SINDA’s reach into the heartlands.

While SINDA benefits the community through initiatives for various groups, volunteers remain crucial to many SINDA programmes and they function as the engines that power the organisation’s efforts. As of 2019, close to 700 volunteers were active at SINDA.

== Signature Events ==
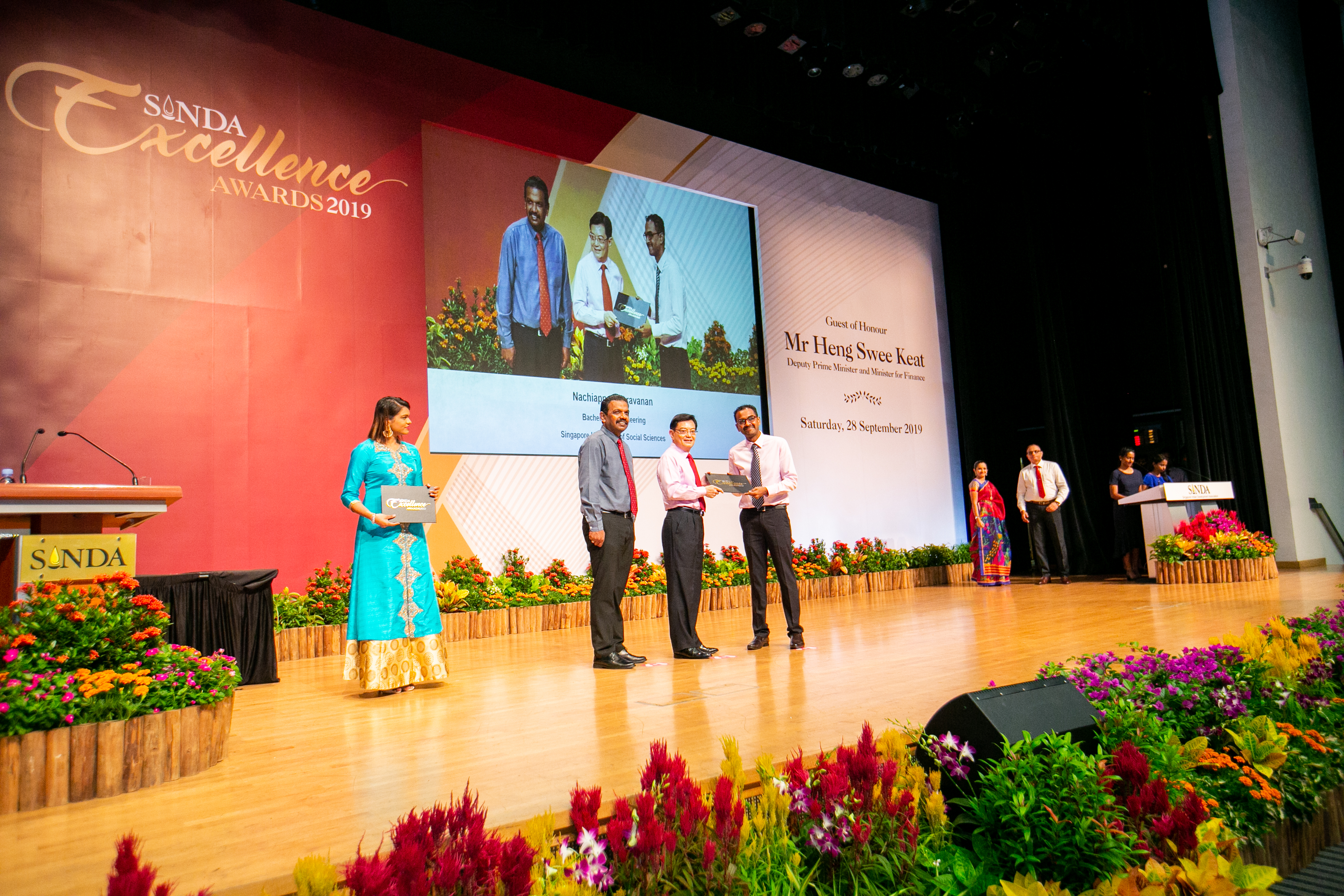
In 2019, 517 students received their SINDA Excellence Awards from Deputy Prime Minister Mr Heng Swee Keat.

=== SINDA Excellence Awards ===
The highest honours bestowed by SINDA upon Indian students who have achieved excellence in their respective academic, arts or sports fields.

=== Joint Tuition Awards ===
An annual ceremony, held in collaboration with the other Self-Help Groups, that recognises top students with significant improvements at landmark examinations across all four Self-Help Groups’ tuition programmes.

=== Back to School Festival ===
A year-end carnival that brings together families in a festive atmosphere and presents students with vouchers to purchase essential items for school, in preparation for the new academic year.

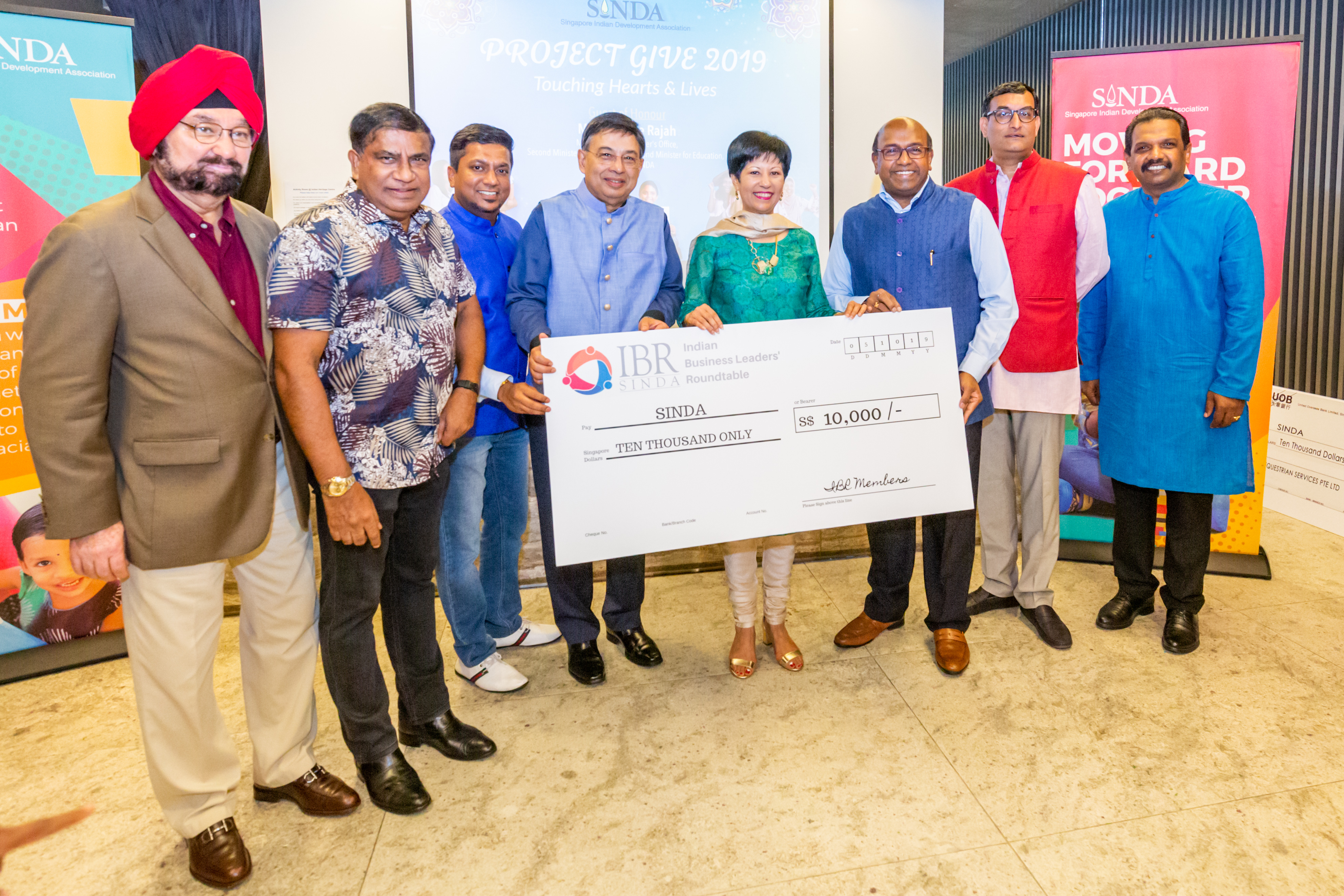
SINDA President Ms Indranee Rajah visiting the Project Give (PG) booth to receive cheques on behalf of the SINDA, in 2019.

=== Project Give ===
An annual fundraising campaign that allows individuals to learn more about SINDA’s initiatives and contribute towards the needs of the Indian community.

=== SINDA Appreciation Ceremony ===
A biennial event that recognises SINDA partners and volunteers for their contribution to the community.

== Affiliated Centres ==
=== SINDA Youth Hub ===
The SINDA Youth Hub was launched in 2018 to serve as a conducive space for students to study in and spend their time in meaningful ways. It also serves as a bridge, linking youth to many other programmes and services offered by SINDA.

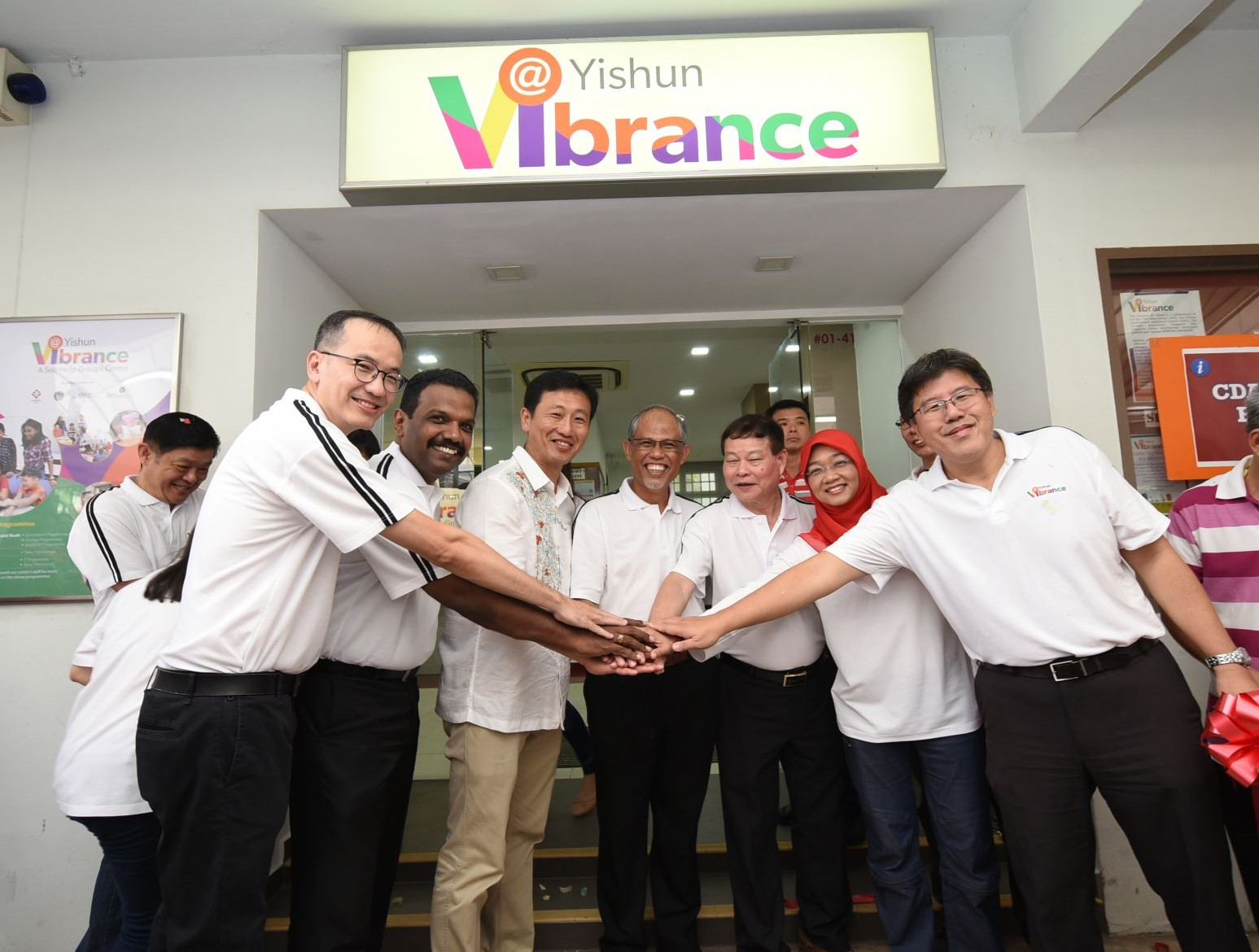
Vibrance @ Yishun is a joint project by the four self-help groups, Chinese Development Assistance Council (CDAC), Eurasian Association, SINDA and Yayasan Mendaki.

=== Vibrance @ Yishun Self-Help Groups Centre ===
The ‘Vibrance @ Yishun’ Self-Help Groups Centre is a collaboration between the four SHGs. Launched in 2018, Vibrance offers students and families enrichment programmes, educational talks and life skills workshops. The centre also helps SHGs meet the needs of their respective communities, by enabling them to run programmes and activities for their respective beneficiaries.

== Board ==
SINDA is overseen by two bodies – the Board of Trustees and the Executive Committee. These bodies are supported by various sub-committees, each with a specialised focus. Senior Minister and Coordinating Minister for Social Policies, Tharman Shanmugaratnam, is Chairman of SINDA’s Board of Trustees, while Indranee Rajah, Minister, Prime Minister’s Office, Second Minister for Finance and National Development is President of SINDA’s Executive Committee.

=== Life Trustees ===
- S Jayakumar
- S Dhanabalan
- S Chandra Das
- J Y Pillay
- Sat Pal Khattar
- Tharman Shanmugaratnam
- K Shanmugam
- N Varaprasad

== SINDA Community Fund ==
All working Singaporean Indians are expected to contribute monthly to the SINDA Community Fund through the Central Provident Fund Board (CPFB) – a community fund for the benefit of Indians, especially in the areas of education, youth support and family assistance.

This includes all working Indians in Singapore who are Singapore Citizens, Permanent Residents and Employment Pass holders and are of Indian descent (including Bangladeshis, Bengalis, Parsees, Sikhs, Sinhalese, Telugus, Pakistanis, Sri Lankans, Goanese, Malayalees, Punjabis, Tamils, Gujaratis, Sindhis and all people originating from the Indian sub-continent.)

== See also ==
- Indian Heritage Centre
- List of Indian organisations in Singapore
