= Andrew Wee =

Singaporean academic

Andrew Wee is a professor of physics at the National University of Singapore. He received his Bachelor of Arts with Honors and Masters degree, both in physics, from the University of Cambridge, in 1984 and 1988 respectively. As a Rhodes Scholar, he attended the University of Oxford, obtaining his Doctor of Philosophy in physics in 1990.
