= Chinese Development Assistance Council =

- Chinese Development Assistance Council
- 華社自助理事會 华社自助理事会
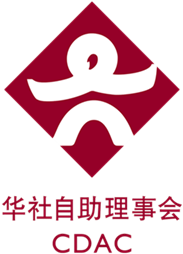
- Abbreviation: CDAC, 华助会
- Formation: May 22, 1992; 34 years ago
- Registration no.: 199202625K
- Purpose: Social mobility
- Headquarters: 65 Tanjong Katong Road, Singapore 436957
- Board Chair: Ong Ye Kung
- Executive Director: Tan Yap Kin
- Affiliations: Singapore Federation of Chinese Clan Associations Singapore Chinese Chamber of Commerce and Industry
- Budget: $36.18m SGD (2023)
- Expenses: $33.89m SGD (2023)
- Website: https://www.cdac.org.sg/

The Chinese Development Assistance Council (CDAC; traditional Chinese: 華社自助理事會; simplified Chinese: 华社自助理事会; pinyin: Huáshè Zìzhù Lǐshì Huì) is a non-profit self-help group that provides assistance to the Chinese community in Singapore. Jointly set up by the Singapore Chinese Chamber of Commerce and Industry (SCCCI) and the Singapore Federation of Chinese Clan Associations (SFCCA), its aims are to help the less privileged in the community maximise their potential and strive for social mobility through self-help and mutual support.

CDAC is one of the four "self-help groups" (SHGs) in Singapore that serves their own respective ethnic community — which also includes Singapore Indian Development Association (SINDA), Eurasian Association and Yayasan Mendaki.

CDAC's programmes primarily covers support through education, family support and wellness for senior citizens.

== History ==
=== 1990s ===
==== Founding years ====
Founded on May 22nd 1992, CDAC's mission was to "To nurture and develop the potential of the Chinese Community in contributing to the continued success of multi-racial Singapore". Mr Wong Kan Seng and Mr Wee Cho Yaw were appointed as the first Chairmen for Board of Directors and Board of Trustees respectively. Back then, the council operated out of a temporary office in SCCCI.

The original CDAC Logo, designed by Mr Lee Tee Song, then-art editor of Lianhe Zaobao, was launched in September. The design was inspired by traditional Spring Festival couplets. Top portion of the lines symbolises the efforts and endeavours made by the beneficiaries for educational advancement, self-reliance and self-improvement. The lower portion of the lines symbolises the assistance and support provided by the community, which appears as a strong and unyielding motivating force.

Within months of setting up, CDAC started providing short-term financial hardship assistance to individuals and families. This was subsequently re-constituted as the CDAC-SFCCA Hardship Assistance Fund.
