= Wee Ee Cheong =

Singaporean businessman

Wee Ee Cheong BBM
- Born: 1952 or 1953 (age 71–72); Colony of Singapore
- Education: American University (BS, MA)
- Occupations: Banker; businessman
- Title: Deputy Chairman & CEO of United Overseas Bank
- Children: 2
- Parent: Wee Cho Yaw (father)

Wee Ee Cheong BBM (born 1952 or 1953) is a Singaporean billionaire businessman and banker who has been the deputy chairman and chief executive officer (CEO) of United Overseas Bank (UOB) since 2007.

== Early life ==
He is the eldest son of Wee Cho Yaw.

Wee earned a bachelor's degree in business administration and a master's degree in applied economics, both from the American University.

== Career ==
In 1979, Wee joined UOB, and in 2000, was appointed deputy chairman and president. Wee has been CEO of UOB since April 2007.

Wee is also deputy chairman of Far Eastern Bank, chair of the Association of Banks in Singapore and the IBF Standards Committee, and an honorary council member of the Singapore Chinese Chamber of Commerce & Industry.

== Honours ==
He was awarded the Public Service Star in 2013.

== Personal life ==
His elder son, Wee Teng Wen is an active businessman who started his own food and beverage company — Lo and Behold Group while his younger son, Wee Teng Chuen, runs an energy-management consultancy — GP Solutions. Both sons are co-founders of For The Love of Laundry, an "environment-friendly laundry service."
