= Nguyễn Văn Minh (disambiguation) =

Nguyễn Văn Minh may refer to:

- Nguyễn Văn Minh, general of the Army of the Republic of Vietnam
- Nguyễn Văn Minh (footballer)
- Minh Nguyen, Vietnamese American professional poker player
