= Singapore Chinese Chamber of Commerce and Industry =

- 新加坡中華總商會 新加坡中华总商会
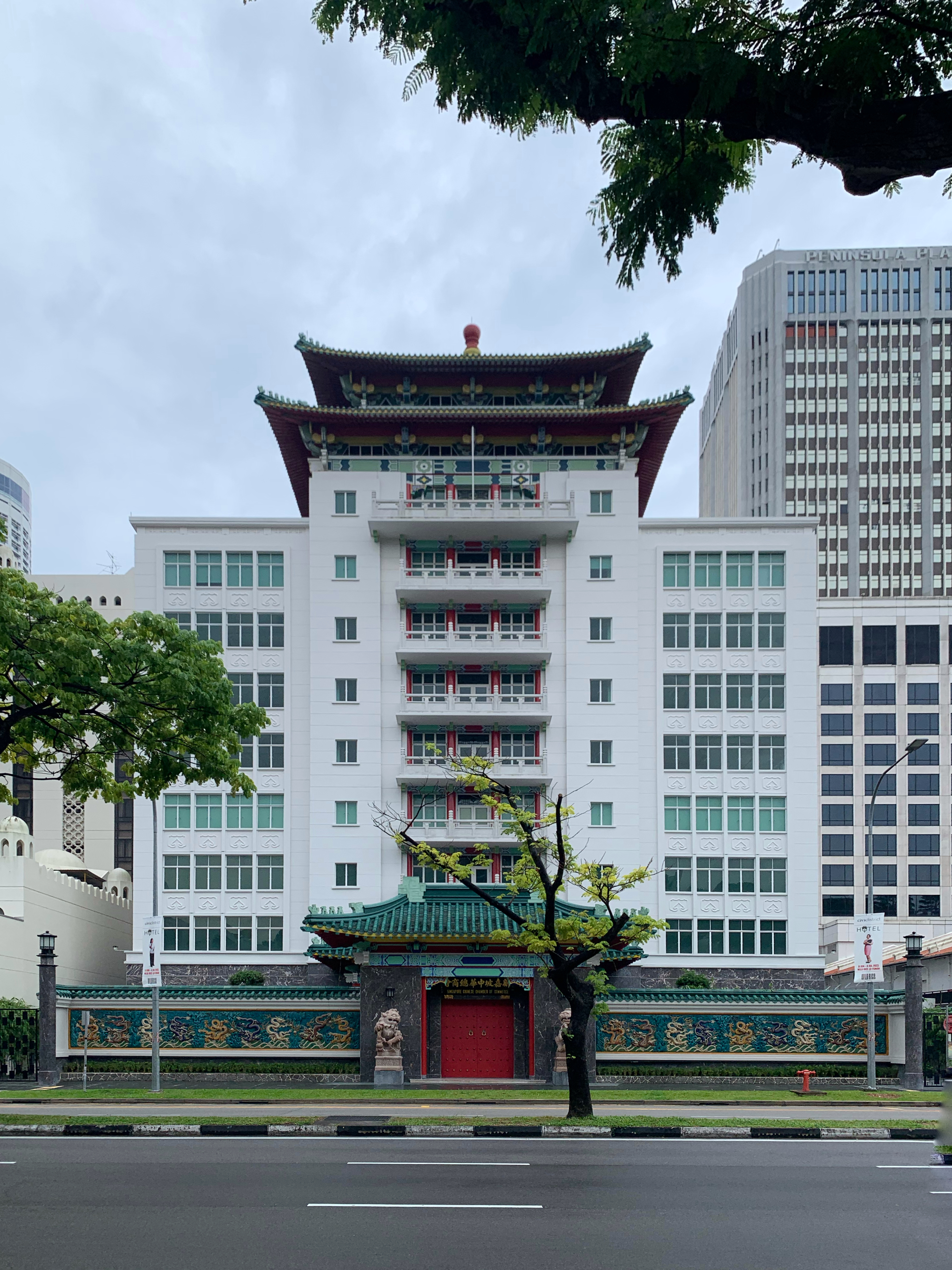
- SCCC Building on Hill Street
- Formation: 1906; 120 years ago
- Founded at: Singapore
- Type: Chamber of commerce
- Purpose: Promote commercial interest of Chinese community, Chinese culture and values
- Headquarters: SCCCI Building
- Location: Hill Street, Singapore
- Coordinates: 1.29322°N 103.85027°E
- Members: 4,000 corporate members, 150 trade associations (2022)
- President: Kho Choon Keng
- Website: www.sccci.org.sg/en
- Formerly called: General Chinese Trade Affairs Association; Singapore Chinese Chamber of Commerce

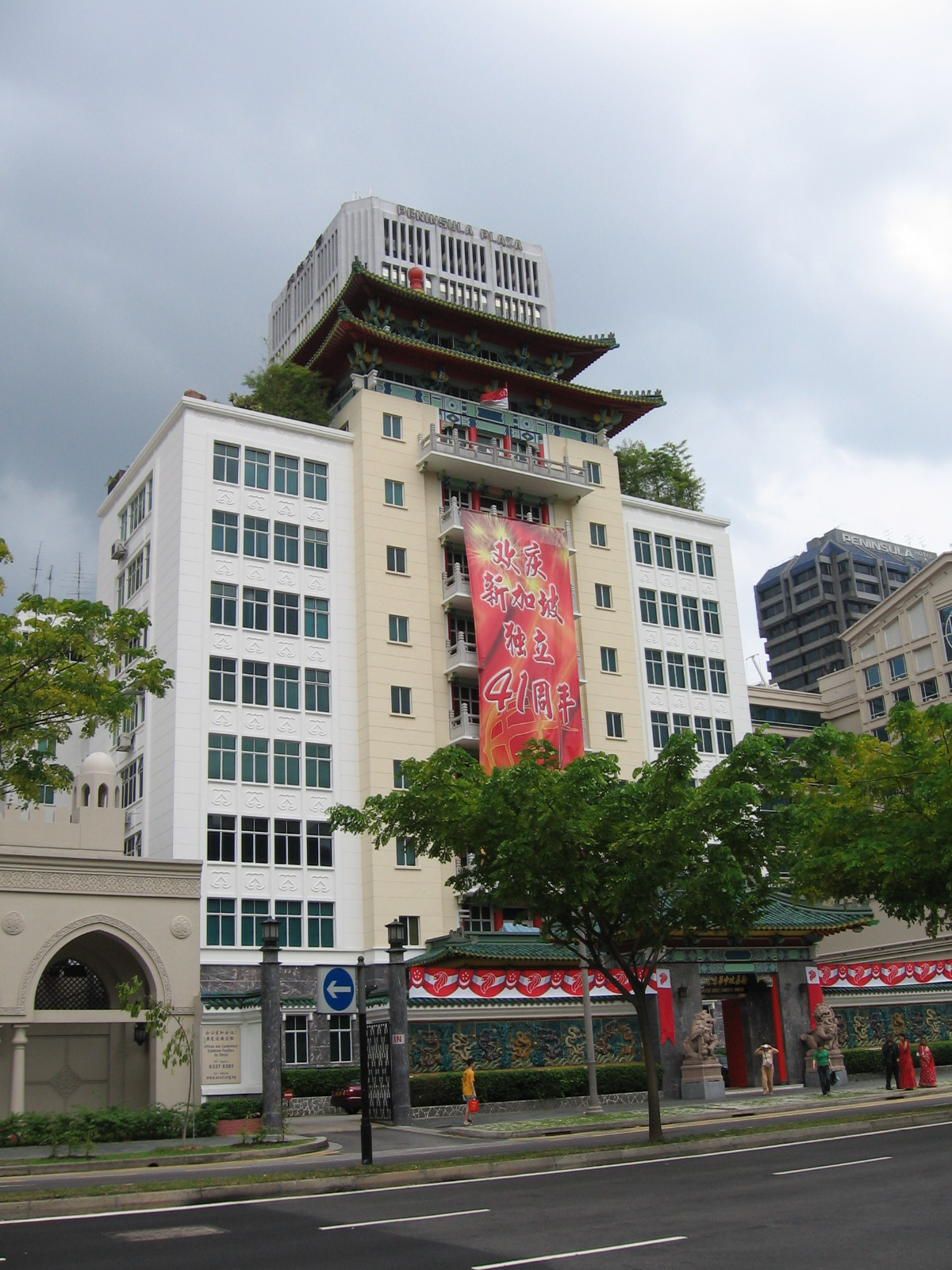
Singapore Chinese Chamber of Commerce and Industry Building on Hill Street

The Singapore Chinese Chamber of Commerce and Industry (SCCCI; traditional Chinese: 新加坡中華總商會; simplified Chinese: 新加坡中华总商会; pinyin: Xīnjīapō Zhōnghuá Zǒngshānghuì) is a business chamber located in Singapore.

The chamber was originally created to protect and promote the commercial interests of the Chinese community in Singapore, but it also played a role in the social, cultural and educational spheres to protect Chinese customs and values. It has raised funds to build schools and provided assistance to the community in times of crisis.

The organization has a membership of more than 4,000 companies and over 150 trade associations in Singapore as of 2016.

== History ==
The Singapore Chinese Chamber of Commerce & Industry (SCCCI) was first established in 1906 as the General Chinese Trade Affairs Association by prominent members of the Chinese community. Its original purpose was to look after the trading interests of the Chinese business community, resolve and mitigate differences among the different clans and champion the Chinese community in Singapore. The first president was Goh Siew Tin.

In 1912, it was renamed as Singapore Chinese Chamber of Commerce when the Republic of China was formed.

In 1951, the chamber lobbied the British colonial government to grant citizenship to Chinese immigrants who had stayed in Singapore for eight years and in 1957, the government approved the proposal.

In February 1962, remains belonging to civilian victims of the Japanese occupation were unearthed in areas like Siglap, Changi and Bukit Timah. The chamber undertook the responsibility of gathering the remains. It also helped in establishing the Civilian War Memorial at Beach Road in 1967.

In 1962, the Chamber started constructing their building at Hill Street and the building was officially opened on 20 September 1964 by Prime Minister Lee Kuan Yew.

In 1966, the Chamber set up the Singapore Chinese Chamber of Commerce Foundation to provide financial assistance to the needy and scholarships to deserving students, and to support cultural activities and public educational political campaigns.

In 1977, it added the “& Industry” to its original name as “Singapore Chinese Chamber of Commerce & Industry”, to reflect its expanded scope of both commerce and industry.

In 1991, the SCCCI organised and held the inaugural World Chinese Entrepreneurs Convention (WCEC) in Singapore which was attended by more than 700 delegates from 30 countries.

During the second WCEC in 1993, Singapore's prime minister Lee Kuan Yew suggested an Internet enabled network of ethnic Chinese businesses worldwide accessible to the various Chinese chambers of commerce in the world. With the help of Institute of Systems Science and Netcentre and a financial grant from the National Science and Technology Board, the SCCCI created the World Chinese Business Network (WCBN). The WCBN was launched on 8 December 1995.

- 1997: The SCCCI's first Annual Internet Commerce Conference is organized. The event is now known as the Infocomm Commerce Conference.
- 2001: The Sun Yat Sen Nanyang Memorial Hall is reopened to members of the public and foreign visitors as a new tourist attraction and national education centre after four years of renovation and restoration.
- 2006: The SCCCI officially launches the Enterprise Development Center@SCCCI (EDC@SCCCI) and Chiye Tong, the Chinese version of the EnterpriseOne portal, a one-stop online information service for small- and medium-sized enterprises.
- 2006: The SCCCI unveiled the Dendrobium Singapore Chinese Chamber of Commerce and Industry as its floral symbol.
- 2006: The SCCCI 100th Anniversary Commemorative Stamp Issue is launched. It is the first ever set of postage stamps issued by Singapore Post on behalf of a local business organisation. The Chamber also changed its logo.
- 2017: The SCCCI relocated to Jurong Town Hall while its building in Hill Street underwent major renovations.
- 2022: The opening of the SCCCI Chinese Business Culture Hub (新加坡中华总商会华商文化馆）in the refurbished SCCCI building. SCCCI Chinese Business Culture Hub exhibits the centennial history, artefacts and culture of the Chamber, promoting the heritage and culture of the Chamber. This is the first time the Chamber set up a permanent exhibit within its building to promote the heritage and culture of the Chamber. The Hub was graced by Prime Minister Lee Hsien Loong and Deputy Prime Minister Lawrence Wong on 10 September 2022, coinciding with Mid-autumn festival.

== SCCCI Building ==
The SCCCI Building is located on Hill Street, facing the Armenian Church. The headquarters of the organisation has been sited here since the early twentieth century.

Before 1964, the headquarters was a two-story building. The construction of the current building started in 1962 and the completed building was officially opened on 20 September 1964. The architecture is a blend of Chinese and Western styles.

== See also ==
- Singapore Hokkien Huay Kuan
- Teochew Poit Ip Huay Kuan
- Chinese Development Assistance Council
- Singapore Malay Chamber of Commerce and Industry
