= Wee Kheng Chiang =

Malaysian Chinese businessman (1890–1978)

Yang Berbahagia Dato’ Wee Kheng Chiang
- 黃慶昌
- Born: Wee Kheng Chiang; 22 July 1890; Kuching, Kingdom of Sarawak
- Died: 12 April 1978 (aged 87); Kuching, Sarawak, Malaysia
- Resting place: Hokkien Cemetery, Batu Kitang Road, Kuching, Malaysia
- Occupations: Banker; trader
- Spouse: Ong Siew Eng
- Children: 5 (including Wee Cho Yaw)
- Parent(s): Wee Tee Yah (father); Song Kim Keow (mother)

Wee Kheng Chiang (simplified Chinese: 黄庆昌; traditional Chinese: 黃慶昌; pinyin: Huáng Qìngchāng; Jyutping: Wong4 Hing3 Coeng1; Pe̍h-ōe-jī: Ûiⁿ Khèng-chhiang; 22 July 1890 – 12 April 1978) was a Malaysian Chinese businessman of Quemoy Bân-lâm Hoklo ancestry who founded the United Chinese Bank (now United Overseas Bank) and Bian Chiang Bank (now known as CIMB Group). He was the father of Wee Cho Yaw, Chairman Emeritus & Adviser of the United Overseas Bank.

== Early life ==
Wee was born into a Hoklo family with ancestry from Quemoy island on 22 July 1890 in Kuching, Sarawak, a British protectorate (now part of Malaysia). He was the family's second-to-eldest son. His father was Wee Tee Yah (died 1889), and his mother was Song Kim Keow, a local born widow. The younger Wee attended Saint Thomas Secondary School and spoke both Hokkien as well as English fluently.

== Career ==
In 1924, Wee established the Bian Chiang Bank (now consolidated under CIMB Group) in his hometown Kuching. In 1975, Fleet Group Sdn Bhd bought a 100% stake in Bian Chiang Bank, making the bank a wholly owned unit of the Fleet group. Subsequently, the bank moved its headquarters to Kuala Lumpur from Kuching.

He became the Treasurer of the Kuching-based Chinese General Chamber of Commerce upon its inception in 1930, before being promoted to president. In addition, Wee was the Hokkien Association (福建会馆)'s President.

In 1931, he was elected as Chairman of the Sarawak Chinese Chamber of Commerce. He resigned from the post in 1946.

On 6 August 1935, he established the United Chinese Bank with six other partners. The bank is now known as the United Overseas Bank (UOB).

Wee staffed his bank with Hoklo employees to serve his Hoklo clients.

== Personal life ==
The Kapitan Cina Ong Tiang Swee (Chinese: 王長水; pinyin: Wáng Chángshuǐ), who was then Kuching's wealthiest person, was impressed by Wee, and decided to let him marry his eldest daughter, Ong Siew Eng (Chinese: 王秀英; pinyin: Wáng Xiùyīng). Wee was then given the role of manager of the Sarawak Chinese Bank, which Ong owned. Wee soon got to know more prominent businesspeople and other important figures; he shortly started a string of businesses, including farming and goods importing and exporting.

He was married twice and had fifteen children (five sons and ten daughters). Wee's second wife is the mother of Wee Cho Yaw, chairman of Singapore's United Overseas Bank.

== Death and legacy ==
On 12 April 1978, Wee died in his Kuching residence. His fourth son, Wee Cho Yaw, was subsequently appointed to head United Overseas Bank. Jalan Datuk Wee Kheng Chiang, a road in downtown Kuching, is named after him.

== Awards ==
Wee Kheng Chiang was posthumously hailed as the "uncrowned king of Sarawak" in Queen of the Head Hunters by Rajah Vyner Brooke's spouse, Sylvia Brooke. Ranee Sylvia Brooke also used this sobriquet, in her 1939 book The Three White Rajahs.

In 1941, Wee was presented with the Commander of the Star of Sarawak by the Third White Rajah of Sarawak. In 1964, he was awarded the Panglima Negara Bintang Sarawak by the first Governor of Sarawak.

== Affiliations ==
- The Sarawak Chinese Chamber of Commerce (1930–1946)
- The Hokkien Association (1932–1947)
- The Singapore-Sarawak Association (from 1930)
- The Hokkien School Management Board (1932–1947)
- The Sarawak China Relief Fund Committee (1938)
- Kuching Joint Primary and Secondary Schools Management Board (1946)
- Kuching China Consulate Building Committee (1949)
- Anti-Tuberculosis Society
- Sarawak Turf Club (1937)
- Sarawak Buddhist Society
- Tse Chia Koh Buddhist Association
- Kuching Hung Nam Shieng Thang
- Sarawak Tong Sin Siang Tong Association
- The Federation of Wee Clan Associations, Sarawak

== Bibliography ==
- Lee, Khoon Choy (2013). Golden Dragon and Purple Phoenix: The Chinese and Their Multi-Ethnic Descendants in Southeast Asia. World Scientific. ISBN 978-981-4383-43-1.
