= Saigon Times Daily =

Vietnamese newspaper

Saigon Times Daily is an English-language daily newspaper published in Ho Chi Minh City, Vietnam. It is one of two English-language dailies in the country (the other is Vietnam News). Saigon News is part of several other newspapers owned by Saigon Times Group.

Saigon Times Daily focuses mainly on the local economic and social situation with its main readers being in Ho Chi Minh City and Đông Nam Bộ. It is available at various newsstands in Vietnam. It is also available aboard Vietnam Airlines flights.
