= Taxand =

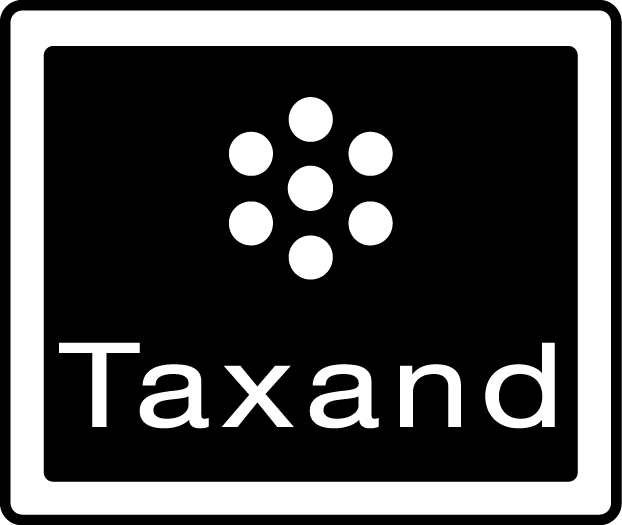
- Company type: Economic Interest Group
- Industry: Professional services
- Founded: 2005
- Headquarters: Luxembourg
- Area served: Worldwide
- Services: Financial Advisory; Tax Advice
- Number of employees: 400 tax partners and over 2,000 advisors in over 40 countries
- Website: Taxand Website

Taxand is a global organisation of tax advisory firms.

Taxand provides audit free, conflict free, partner led, integrated international tax advice. Each firm in each country is a separate and independent legal entity.

Taxand has over 2000 tax advisers from over 40 countries.
