= UOB-Kay Hian =

Singapore-based stockbroker

UOB Kay Hian Holdings LTM
- Native name: 大华继显控股有限公司
- Company type: Public
- Traded as: SGX: UOKH
- Industry: Financial services
- Founded: Early 1900s (as Kay Hian & Co)
- Founder: Khoo Kay Hian
- Headquarters: Singapore
- Key people: Chairman: Mr. Wee Ee-chao
- Services: Brokerage services; Corporate financial advisory; Private wealth management; Research
- Revenue: SGD$375 million
- Operating income: SGD$124 million
- Net income: SGD$75 million
- Number of employees: 3,036
- Parent: United Overseas Bank
- Website: www.uobkayhian.com

UOB Kay Hian Holdings Limited (Chinese: 大华继显控股有限公司; pinyin: Dàhuá Jì Xiǎn Kònggǔ Yǒuxiàn Gōngsī) is a Singapore-based brokerage firm that engages in brokerage services, private wealth management, investment management and financial research. UOB Kay Hian was founded in the early 1900s by Khoo Kay Hian as Kay Hian & Co (Pte).

It is headquartered in Singapore, with additional offices in Hong Kong, Shanghai, Jakarta, Makati City, London, Toronto, Kuala Lumpur, Bangkok and New York City. Following its incorporation in June 1970 and the merger of Kay Hian Holdings with UOB Securities in October 2000, UOB Kay Hian Holdings was established.

== History ==
In the early 1900s, Khoo Kay Hian established a stockbroking firm, Kay Hian & Co, to deal in commodities and securities. Kay Hian & Co was one of the founding members of the Singapore Stockbrokers Association. The company was incorporated as a private company, Kay Hian & Co (Pte), in June 1970.

After the Stock Exchange of Malaysia and Singapore was split into two stock exchanges in Singapore and Malaysia, Kay Hian & Co (Pte) became a member of the Stock Exchange of Singapore (SES).

In August 1987, the company was subsequently renamed Kay Hian Pte Ltd.

On 5 January 1989, James Capel International Holdings BV was approved by the SES to take up 30% equity stake of Kay Hian Pte Ltd. In June, James Capel Singapore Holdings Pte Ltd merged with Kay Hian Pte Ltd and the company was renamed Kay Hian James Capel (KHJC). In October 1990, KHJC issued 25% of its equity to the public and was listed on the SES. On 1 Aug 1996, HSBC James Capel group reduced its stake in KHJC and the company was renamed as Kay Hian Holdings Ltd.

In 1999, Kay Hian Holdings Ltd managed to secure a seat on the Stock Exchange of Hong Kong.

On 27 September 2000, United Overseas Bank Securities Pte Ltd's and Kay Hian's shareholders approved the merger of both companies. The merger includes Kay Hian Holdings Ltd, UOB Securities Pte Ltd and The United Overseas Bank Group's overseas stockbroking interests (including Hong Kong, Thailand, Indonesia and the Philippines). The merger was approved by the High Court of Singapore and was effective on 21 October. In January 2001, the merged company was named UOB-Kay Hian Holdings Ltd.

In March 2001, Kay Hian Overseas Securities Ltd and United Mok Ying Kie Ltd were merged.

In May 2002, OUB Securities (Hong Kong) Ltd and UOB Kay Hian (Hong Kong) Ltd were merged.

In June 2005, UOB Kay Hian Securities (Thailand) Public Company Limited was listed on the Stock Exchange of Thailand.

== Controversies ==
=== Breaches of anti-money laundering rules and business conduct compliance failures ===
On 31 August 2022, UOB Kay Hian was fined S$375,000 by the Monetary Authority of Singapore (MAS) for failing to comply with business conduct requirements under the Securities and Futures (Licensing and Conduct of Business) Regulations, as well as anti-money laundering and countering the financing of terrorism requirements listed by the MAS. UOB Kay Hian failed to detect and report suspicious transactions despite red flags of potential nominee arrangements, which may be abused to conceal beneficial ownerships and facilitate market misconduct. UOB Kay Hian also failed to verify customers' source of wealth, even though they were determined by the firm to be of higher money laundering risk.

=== S$3 billion money laundering case in 2023 ===
On 4 July 2025, UOB Kay Hian was handed S$2.85 million in penalty by the Monetary Authority of Singapore (MAS) for flouting anti-money laundering controls related to the 2023 money laundering case involving more than S$3 billion in assets. The 10 criminals were reportedly part of the Fujian gang, an organised crime syndicate originally from China’s Fujian province who washed more than S$3 billion in illicit funds and used multiple passports to avoid detection. All have been jailed, deported after serving their sentences and barred from re-entering Singapore.

UOB Kay Hian did not adequately establish and corroborate the source of wealth of customers who posed a higher risk of money laundering, even though there were significant discrepancies in the documents they had provided. UOB Kay Hian also did not adequately investigate suspicious transactions flagged by its own system and fell short in following up on suspicious transaction reports filed against its customers. The institution failed to take adequate and timely risk mitigation measures, such as enhanced monitoring and reviewing the customers’ risk classification. In addition, UOB Kay Hian failed to implement adequate policies or processes for rating money laundering risks presented by some of its customers. This led to misrating of the risks and affected its ability to address higher money laundering risks presented by several persons of interest.
