= Hsuan Owyang =

Singaporean stockbroker (1928–2018)

Hsuan Owyang PJG

Chairman of the Housing and Development Board
- In office 1 August 1983 – 1 October 1998
- Preceded by: Michael Fam
- Succeeded by: Ngiam Tong Dow

Personal details
- Born: 24 March 1928 Guangzhou, China
- Died: 23 August 2018 (aged 90) San Diego, California
- Spouse: June Tong (m. 1967)
- Children: 2
- Education: Harvard Business School (MBA); University of Dubuque (BSc)

Chinese name
- Traditional Chinese: 歐陽壎
- Simplified Chinese: 欧阳壎
Transcriptions
Standard Mandarin
- Hanyu Pinyin: Ōuyáng Xūn
- IPA: [óʊ.jǎŋ.ɕwə́n]

Hsuan Owyang PJG (24 March 1928 – 23 August 2018) was a Singaporean stockbroker and former chairman of the Housing and Development Board from 1983 to 1998.

== Early life and education ==
On 24 March 1928, Hsuan Owyang was born in Guangzhou, China. His father, Chi Owyang, worked as a banker for the Industrial and Commercial Bank in Wuhan, before being promoted to assistant general manager of its branch in Guangzhou. Owyang was the eldest son, and he had five brothers and a sister.

Owyang received his secondary education in Chongqing, China.

In 1946, Owyang started his undergraduate studies at Lingnan University. From 1947 to 1948, he studied at the St. John's University, Shanghai. In 1949, Owyang moved to the United States and enrolled in the University of Dubuque. In 1950, Owyang graduated with a Bachelor of Science in business administration. Later, he enrolled in Harvard Business School and graduated in 1952 with a Master of Business Administration.

== Career ==
In 1952, Owyang joined Thomson & McKinnon, an investment and brokerage company in New York City, as an investment counsellor. He remained at the company for 12 years. In December 1964, upon returning to Singapore, Owyang joined the Overseas Union Bank (OUB) as an assistant to the general manager. Owyang was promoted to general manager and concurrently served as a director of the bank.

During a seminar titled "Changing Trends in the Management of Banks" held in 1977, Owyang said that internationalisation of banking activities will continue to intensify, and computerisation will make significant contribution to banks.

In September 1982, Owyang was one of the six founding directors for the bank's wholly owned subsidiary in Toronto, Canada. (Note: Namely, Lien Ying Chow, Lee Hee Seng, Loo Heng Sun, Koh Choon Liat, and Low Beng Bak.) In October 1982, to manage the international operations of OUB, he was appointed to be director of its international division.

On 1 February 1983, Owyang resigned from OUB to join the Post Office Savings Bank (POSB) its deputy chairman and chief executive officer. On 1 August 1983, Owyang took over Michael Fam as chairman of the Housing and Development Board (HDB), after the latter became chairman at the newly formed Mass Rapid Transit Corporation.

In April 1985, Owyang was appointed as deputy chairman of the Network for Electronic Transfers, serving alongside chairman Allan Ng. Owyang was promoted to chairman in April 1986. In February 1988, at the end of the a five-year contract, Owyang left POSB. In September 1989, Owyang was appointed as chairman of the Institute of Policy Studies (IPS), succeeding Yong Pung How.

In February 1995, Owyang, alongside Herman Hochstadt and Tang I-Fang, was appointed as a pro-chancellor for the Nanyang Technological University. On 1 October 1998, Owyang relinquished his chairmanship of HDB to Ngiam Tong Dow. On 18 April 2000, Owyang took over Han Cheng Fong as chairman of DBS Land.

After 15 years at IPS, Owyang stepped down as chairman in July 2004, and he was succeeded by Tommy Koh.

== Personal life ==
On 31 May 1967, Owyang married June Tong and they held their wedding in the auditorium of the Singapore Chinese Chamber of Commerce. They had a daughter and a son.

Upon retirement in 2008, he moved to San Diego, California, to be closer to his family. Owyang died on 23 August 2018.

== Bibliography ==
- Owyang, Hsuan (1996). The Barefoot Boy from Songwad: The Life of Chi Owyang. Singapore: Times Editions. ISBN 978-9812-04-691-8.
- Owyang, Hsuan (1998). From Wall Street to Bukit Merah: Strategies of a Corporate Leader. Singapore: Times Books International. ISBN 978-9812-04-969-8.

== Awards and decorations ==
- Meritorious Service Medal, in 1993.
