= Lee Hee Seng =

Singaporean banker (1927–2012)

Edward Lee Hee Seng DUBC PJG
- Lee in 1974

Chairman of the Housing and Development Board
- In office 2 April 1971 – 1 April 1975
- Preceded by: Pang Tee Pow
- Succeeded by: Michael Fam

Chairman of the Public Service Commission
- In office 1 August 1988 – 1 August 1998
- Preceded by: Tan Teck Chwee
- Succeeded by: Andrew Chew

Personal details
- Born: Lee Hee Seng; 11 April 1927 Singapore, Straits Settlements, British Malaya
- Died: 4 February 2012 (aged 84) Singapore
- Spouse: Dorothy Tan Siew Choon
- Children: 4
- Education: Administrative Staff College; Raffles Institution

Chinese name
- Traditional Chinese: 李喜盛
- Simplified Chinese: 李喜盛
Transcriptions
Standard Mandarin
- Hanyu Pinyin: Lǐ Xǐshèng
- IPA: [lì.ɕì.ʂə̂ŋ]

Edward Lee Hee Seng (Note: Chinese: see Chinese name and romanisations) DUBC PJG (11 April 1927 – 4 February 2012) was a former Singaporean banker, and chairman of the Public Service Commission from 1988 to 1998. He was also chairman of the Housing and Development Board from 1971 to 1975.

In 1995, Lee succeeded Lien Ying Chow as chairman of the Overseas Union Bank, and was an important stakeholder in the bank, up till the merger with United Overseas Bank (UOB). He retired from UOB in 2003.

== Early life and education ==
Edward Lee Hee Seng received his early education at St. Patrick's School. Later, Lee attended Raffles Institution and graduated in 1946 with a School Certificate. He was also a graduate of the Administrative Staff College.

In 1954, Lee was the first Malayan to pass the final examination conducted by the Building Societies' Institute, and was appointed as associate of the institute.

== Career ==
Upon graduation, Lee joined the Commonwealth Development Corporation and was seconded to the Federal and Colonial Building Society (now known as the Malaya Building Society Berhad). In 1955, he was appointed as secretary of the society. In 1964, he was promoted again and served as general manager. Lee left the society in 1971 and returned to Singapore from Kuala Lumpur.

=== Housing Development Board (1971–1975) ===
On 2 April 1971, Lee was appointed as chairman of the Housing and Development Board (HDB), after the position was vacant since August 1970 following the resignation of Pang Tee Pow. In August 1971, New Zealand Minister for Housing John Rae was brought to tour new HDB flats in Queenstown by Lee, along with Minister for Law and National Development Edmund W. Barker. In February 1972, Lee and Barker accompanied Queen Elizabeth II to tour a housing estate in Toa Payoh. During a review conducted at the end of 1972, HDB built a record 20,525 units of shops and flats, with a further 36,560 units under construction. HDB also raised its 5-year target from 100,000 to 125,000 units. Lee elaborated in his review:

The standard of public housing provided by the Housing and Development Board is not only among the highest in Asian countries, but is also comparable to European and American standards.
Owing to boom conditions the values of properties in the Republic have risen substantially in the past three years. The selling prices of housing developed by private enterprise are no longer related to income and are beyond the reach of many middle-income earners who now look to the Board to provide them with homes.

On 1 April 1975, Lee stepped down as chairman of HDB, and was succeeded by Michael Fam. In 1976, in recognition of his contributions to HDB, he was awarded the Meritorious Service Medal.

=== Overseas Union Bank and United Overseas Bank (1974–2003) ===
On 1 April 1974, Lee was appointed as a director of Overseas Union Bank (OUB), after Lien Ying Chow spent three years convincing Lee to join the bank. Lien felt that OUB had to transition from a traditional Chinese family-owned bank to a meritocratic and modern bank, and that was one of Lee's first tasks as director. Lee prepared OUB for a public listing, and on 21 August 1975, OUB began trading on the Stock Exchange of Singapore. However, at a debut price of S$3.00 per share, shares were traded to as low as S$2.54.

In May 1978, as part of modernising the bank using technology, Lee was appointed chairman of Associated Data Processing, a private limited company with a paid-up capital of S$1 million. The computer company was set up by OUB, along with Asia Commercial Banking Corporation, Far Eastern Bank, Industrial and Commercial Bank. Each of the banks contributed to 25% of the capital. This was the first time that local banks joined forces to form such a company, providing real-time access and transactions to accounts between the banks. Lee explained further:

Apart from simplifying branch accounting and record-keeping functions, the computer systems will provide faster counter services for customers.

On 17 October 1978, Lee was appointed as one of the directors of the Nanyang Press, publisher of the Nanyang Siang Pau. On 28 July 1979, Lee was appointed by President Benjamin Sheares as a justice of the peace. On 12 February 1980, Lee was appointed as a member of the Public Service Commission (PSC).

In July 1980, Lee was promoted to become managing director of OUB. Under his leadership, OUB established wholly owned subsidiaries in Toronto and Sydney, restructured its operations, and acquired the International Bank of Singapore. After a decade of managing OUB, the bank's profits grew 25% annually. In June 1988, Lee was promoted to group deputy chairman of OUB.

On 1 August 1988, Lee succeeded Tan Teck Chwee as chairman of PSC. To concentrate on his new role, Lee gave up his directorships in publicly listed companies, and only retaining the position of group deputy chairman of OUB and managing director of the hotel-managing arm of OUB. In recognition of his contributions to the public service, Lee was awarded the Distinguished Service Order in November 1989. Throughout his term, he was also appointed chairman to various newly commissions, dealing with education, police and civil defence. Lee's ten year term ended on 1 August 1998, and he was succeeded by Andrew Chew.

In March 1995, Lee succeeded Lien as chairman of OUB. In June 2001, DBS Bank launched a hostile bid of S$9.4 billion to take over OUB. However, important stakeholders of OUB, such as Lee, showed no interest in agreeing to the unsolicited deal. In August 2001, a document prepared by Goldman Sachs, DBS' financial adviser, was released to investors during a DBS roadshow in Europe. It contained critical statements criticising OUB and the United Overseas Bank (UOB), and suggested that there would be "decision paralysis and infighting" if the two banks merged. DBS apologised for the incident, and paid S$1 million each to chairmen from both banks, which was donated to charity. Lee and Wee Cho Yaw accepted the apology. Lee felt that the defamatory statements were personal.

In a circular to OUB shareholders, Lee pushed for shareholders to accept takeover bid of S$10 billion from UOB, and said that merging with UOB will be better in the long run. In August 2001, majority of shareholders voted to accept the bid from UOB, and only 1.2% of shareholders accepted the offer from DBS. As such, DBS conceded, and OUB merged with UOB. Lee was the only representative from OUB as part of a four-man team to supervise the merger, and he was appointed as senior deputy chairman of UOB.

In May 2003, he retired from UOB, marking the end of a 53-year career in the financial industry.

== Personal life ==
Lee was a Catholic.

Lee was married to Dorothy Tan Siew Choon, and had four children. His eldest daughter, Jennifer Lee Gek Choo, was a President's Scholar and served as chief operating officer of the Singapore General Hospital from 1988 to 1991. In October 1999, she was the first non-married woman to serve as a Nominated Member of Parliament (NMP) in the 9th Parliament and 10th Parliament till 2005, making her one of the longest serving NMP.

On 4 February 2012, after battling cancer for nine years, Lee died at the age of 84. The funeral was held at the Church of St. Ignatius, located along King's Road. Archibishop Nicholas Chia celebrated the funeral mass, and described Lee as "a man of faith, integrity and responsibility".

== Awards and decorations ==
- Distinguished Service Order, in 1989.
- Meritorious Service Medal, in 1977.
