= Tommy Koh =

Singaporean diplomat and lawyer

Tommy Koh DUNU DUBC PJG BBM
- 许通美
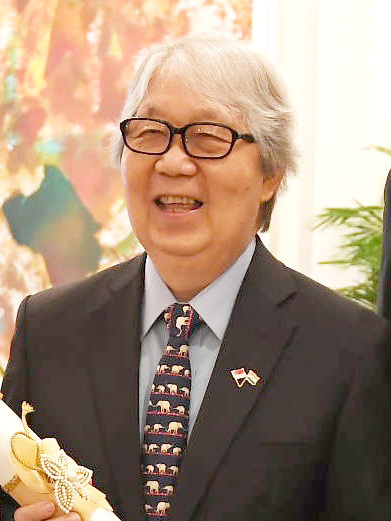
- Koh in 2018
- Born: 12 November 1937 (age 89); Singapore, Straits Settlements
- Education: University of Malaya (LLB); Harvard University (LLM); University of Cambridge
- Occupations: Lawyer; professor; diplomat; author
- Spouse: Poh Siew Aing (m. 1967)
- Children: Aun Koh; Wei Koh

Tommy Koh
- Simplified Chinese: 许通美
Transcriptions
Standard Mandarin
- Hanyu Pinyin: Xǔ Tōngměi
Southern Min
- Hokkien POJ: Khó Thong-bí

Tommy Koh Thong Bee DUNU DUBC PJG BBM (Chinese: 许通美; pinyin: Xǔ Tōngměi; born 12 November 1937) is a Singaporean diplomat, lawyer, professor and author who served as Singapore's Permanent Representative to the United Nations between 1968 and 1971.

== Early life and education ==
Koh, the eldest of three sons, was born in Singapore on 12 November 1937. His father was originally from Tong'an, Fujian and his mother was from Shanghai. He attended from Serangoon Secondary School and Raffles Institution before graduating from the Singapore campus of the University of Malaya (now the National University of Singapore) with a Bachelor of Laws with first class honours degree.

He subsequently went on to complete a Master of Laws degree at Harvard University, where he was classmate with Ngiam Tong Dow, and a Graduate Diploma in criminology at the University of Cambridge.

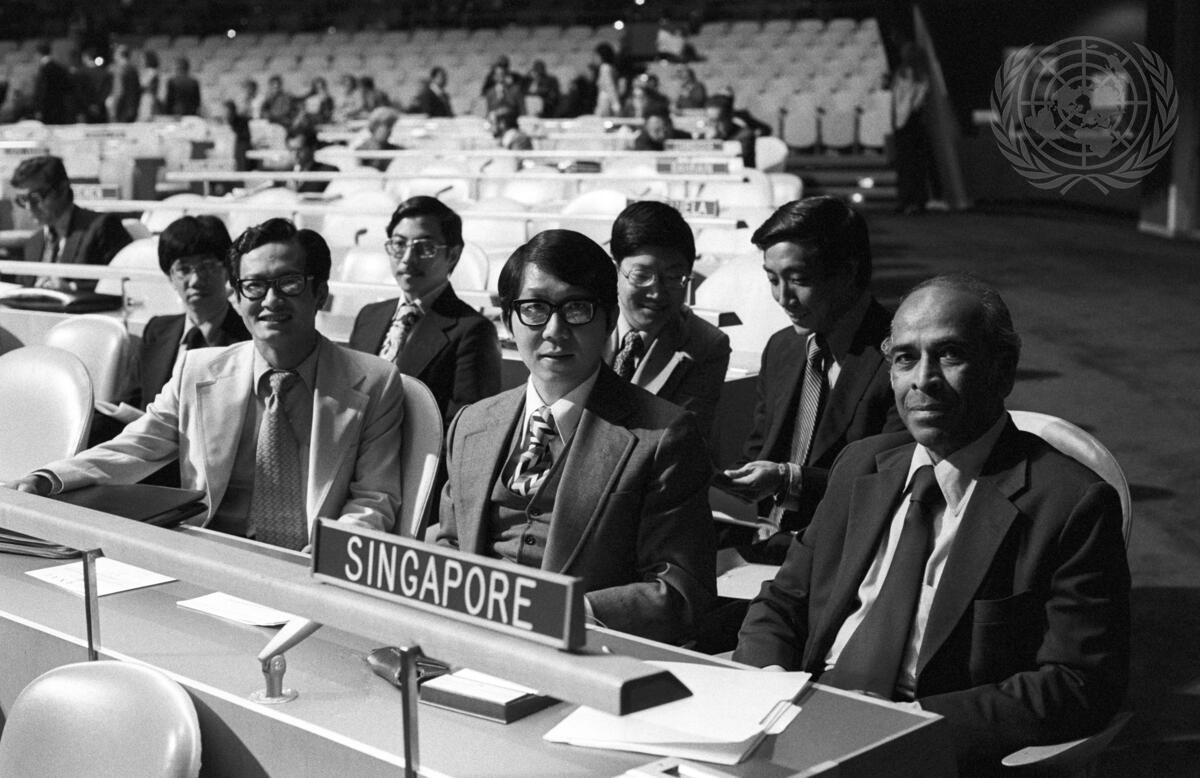
Singapore’s United Nations delegation roster, 24 September 1975. Permanent Representative Tommy Koh is at center, with Foreign Minister S. Rajaratnam seated to his right.

Koh was conferred a full professorship in 1977. Koh was awarded honorary Doctor of Laws degrees from Yale University, Monash University, and the National University of Singapore. He has also received awards from Columbia University, Stanford University, Georgetown University, the Fletcher School of Law and Diplomacy at Tufts University, and Curtin University.

== Career ==
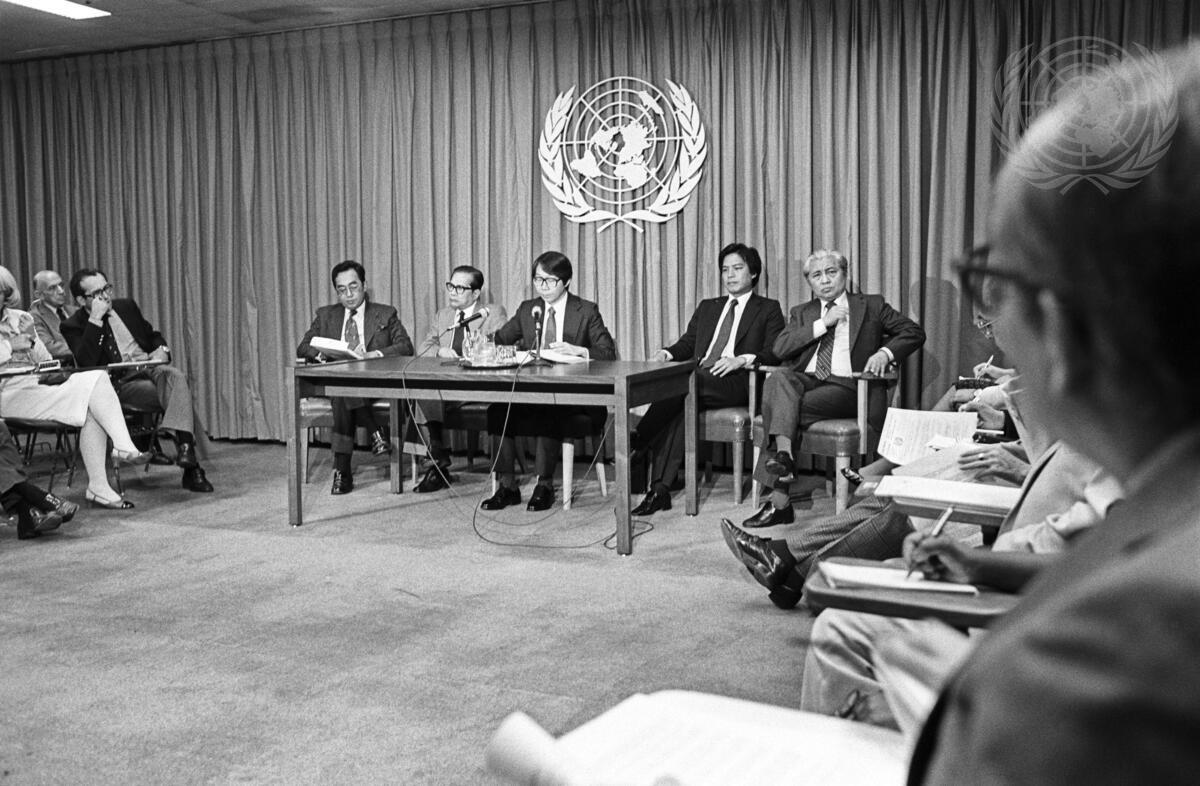
Singapore’s Tommy Koh (middle) speaks for ASEAN at a UN press conference during the Kampuchean crisis, with envoys from Malaysia, the Philippines, Thailand, and Indonesia, 20 July 1981

Koh is an international law professor, action and Ambassador-at-Large for the Singaporean government. He presently serves as Special Adviser at the Institute of Policy Studies, Chairman of the National Heritage Board, Chairman of the Governing Board of the Centre for International Law, and Rector of Tembusu College at the National University of Singapore. He is on secondment from the National University of Singapore Faculty of Law.

Koh was President of the Third United Nations Conference on the Law of the Sea, from 1980 to 1982. Lax and Sebenius present Koh's efforts in getting the Convention passed as an example of successful negotiating. From 1990 to 1992, he served as Chairman of the Main Committee of the UN Conference on Environment and Development, where he presided over the negotiations on Agenda 21. He has also served as Singapore's ambassador to the United Nations and the United States.

Koh was the first Executive Director of the Asia-Europe Foundation (ASEF), established in Singapore in 1997 by the countries of the Asia-Europe Meeting (ASEM).

On 9 August 2008, Koh was conferred with the Order of Nila Utama (First Class) by the Singaporean government for his outstanding contributions in the Singapore legislative team representing Singapore in the Pedra Branca dispute case with the Malaysian government.

In 2014, Koh received the Great Negotiator Award from Program on Negotiation at Harvard Law School for his multiple contributions to diplomacy, most notably his work as chief negotiator for the United States–Singapore Free Trade Agreement, his work around developing the Association of Southeast Asian Nations, his important efforts in resolving territorial and humanitarian disputes in the Baltics and Asia, and his success in leading both the Third UN Conference on the Law of the Sea and the UN Conference on Environment and Development (also known as the Rio Earth Summit).

In September 2018, via a Facebook post, Tommy Koh encouraged the LGBT communities of Singapore to challenge Section 377A of the Penal Code which criminalise same-sex intercourse between men.

Koh retired from the MFA in August 2026.

Koh is on the panel of mediators for Singapore International Mediation Centre (SIMC).

== Selected writings ==
- Tommy Koh, Constitution of the Oceans, UNCLOS December 1982, accessed 20 May 2017
- Tommy Koh, Five Years After Rio:Some Personal Reflections, UN Chronicle 1997, accessed at Essay 29 August 2006
- Tommy T.B. Koh and Amitav Acharya (ed.), The Quest for World Order: Perspectives of a Pragmatic Idealist, Times Academic Press, Singapore, 1997 ISBN 981-210-108-X
- Tommy Koh, Five Years After Rio:Some Personal Reflections, UN Chronicle 1997, accessed at Essay 29 August 2006
- Tommy Koh (2013). The Tommy Koh Reader: Favourite Essays and Lectures. World Scientific, 2013. p. 640. doi:10.1142/8999. ISBN 978-981-4571-07-4.
- Tommy Koh, Li Lin Chang and Joanna Koh (2015). 50 Years of Singapore and the United Nations. World Scientific, 2015. p. 384. doi:10.1142/9729. ISBN 978-981-4713-03-0.
- Tommy Koh, Sharon Li-Lian Seah and Li Lin Chang (2017). 50 Years of ASEAN and Singapore. World Scientific, 2017. p. 444. doi:10.1142/10572. ISBN 9789813225121.
- Tommy Koh and Li Lin Chang (2005). The Little Red Dot. World Scientific, 2005. p. 504. doi:10.1142/5893 (inactive 12 July 2025). ISBN 9789812564146.
- Koh, Tommy (2020). Fifty Secrets of Singapore's Success. Straits Times Press.
- Tommy T.B. Koh & Hernaikh Singh (eds), India On Our Minds: Essays By Tharman Shanmugaratnam And 50 Singaporean Friends Of India, World Scientific Publishing, 2021.
- Tommy Koh, Lin Heng Lye and Shawn Lum (eds). Peace with Nature: 50 Inspiring Essays on Nature and the Environment. World Scientific, 2023.

== Honours and awards ==
- 1961: Adrian Clarke Memorial Medal, University of Malaya (Singapore).
- 1961: Leow Chia Heng Prize, University of Malaya (Singapore).
- 1963: Fulbright Student, Master of Laws (LLM), Harvard University.
- 1971: Public Service Star (Bintang Bakti Masyarakat), Singapore.
- 1976: International Visitors Leadership Program (IVLP), Washington DC.
- 1979: Meritorious Service Medal (Pingat Jasa Gemilang), Singapore.
- 1984: Wolfgang Friedman Award, Columbia University Law School, New York.
- 1984: Honorary Doctor of Laws (LL.D), Yale University, Connecticut.
- 1985: Jackson H. Ralston Prize, Stanford Law School, California.
- 1985: Annual Award of the Asia Society, New York.
- 1987: International Service Award, Fletcher School of Law and Diplomacy, Tufts University, USA.
- 1987: Jit Trainor Award for Distinction in Diplomacy, Georgetown University, USA.
- 1990: Distinguished Service Order Award (Darjah Utama Bakti Cemerlang), Singapore.
- 1993: Commander, Order of the Golden Ark, The Netherlands.
- 1996: Elizabeth Haub Prize for Environmental Law, University of Brussels.
- 1997: Grand Cross of the Order of Bernardo O'Higgins, Chile.
- 1998: Fok Ying Tung Southeast Asia Prize, Fok Ying Tung Foundation, Hong Kong (29 May).
- 2000: Commander, First Class, of the Order of the Lion of Finland.
- 2000: John Curtin Medal, Curtin University of Technology, Western Australia.
- 2000: Grand Officer, Order of Merit of the Grand Duchy of Luxembourg.
- 2000: Distinguished Service to Arts Education, LASALLE-SIA College Award.
- 2001: Officer in the Légion d'honneur, President of the French Republic.
- 2002: Honorary Doctor of Laws (LL.D), Monash University, Melbourne, Victoria, Australia.
- 2003: Peace and Commerce Award for efforts at building trade links with the United States.
- 2004: Outstanding Service Award, National University of Singapore on 12 May.
- 2004: Encomienda of Isabel la Catolica, from His Majesty King Juan Carlos of Spain on 24 May.
- 2006: Champions of the Earth, United Nations Environment Programme.
- 2006: President's Award for the Environment, Singapore.
- 2006: Build A Better World Award, CH2M Hill.
- 2007: Watermark Honorary Award, Public Utilities Board, Singapore.
- 2007: Tatler Leadership Award for Lifetime Achievement, Singapore Tatler magazine.
- 2008: Order of Nila Utama (First Class), Singapore.
- 2008: Onassis Distinguished Scholars Award, Rhodes Academy of Oceans Law and Policy, Rhodes, Greece.
- 2009: Order of the Rising Sun, Gold and Silver Star, 2009 (Japan).
- 2014: Great Negotiator Award, 2014 (Harvard Law School/Harvard Kennedy School).
- 2017: Mochtar Kusumaatmadja Award (Inaugural), Indonesia.
- 2018: Padma Shri, India's fourth highest civilian honour.
- 2020: World Toilet Organization (WTO) Hall of Fame Award.
- 2022: Honorary Doctor of Laws (LL.D), National University of Singapore (NUS).
- 2023: ASIANSIL Paik Choong-Hyun Prize, Asian Society of International Law.
- 2024: Adinata Award, Indonesia.
- 2026: Ramon Magsaysay Award 2026

== Lectures ==
- The Art and Science of Chairing Major Inter-governmental Conferences in the Lecture Series of the United Nations Audiovisual Library of International Law
- The Negotiating Process of UNCLOS III in the Lecture Series of the United Nations Audiovisual Library of International Law
- Straits Used for International Navigation in the Lecture Series of the United Nations Audiovisual Library of International Law

== Personal life ==
Tommy Koh is married to Poh Siew Aing. They have two sons, of which Wei Koh is a known publisher in modern horology media and Aun Koh is a well known blogger.

== See also ==
- Practical idealism
- Koh, Buck Song (1996), Interview with Professor Tommy Koh in The Arts in Singapore, 1996, Singapore: National Arts Council and Accent Communications.
