= Chi Owyang =

Banker and diplomat

- 欧阳奇
- Born: 12 November 1897; Chenghai County, Guangdong Province, Qing Empire
- Died: 25 November 1988 (aged 91); Bangkok, Thailand
- Occupations: Banker and diplomat
- Children: 7

Chi Owyang (12 November 1897 – 25 November 1988) was a banker, and was Singapore's ambassador to Thailand for 17 years, becoming the country's longest serving ambassador.

== Early life and education ==
Owyang was born in 1897 in Chaozhou, Guandong Province, China, and spent his childhood in Thailand. He was brought to Bangkok, when he was one year old by his parents, his mother being Thai of Chinese descent. His father operated a small trading business and owned a small wharf at Songwad, alongside the Chao Phraya River. After his father died in 1906 he was sent to become a novice at Wat Bopitpimook, and later joined the Chinese school in Rajawong.

In 1914, his mother decided to send him to China for further education using all her meagre savings, and he went to Swatow, Guangdong Province, where he enrolled at the Anglo-Chinese School. After completing his high school education he went to Fudan University, Shanghai, and in 1921 graduated with a B.A. in commerce and banking, becoming the first student from Thailand to graduate from China.

== Career ==
=== Banking career ===
After graduating, Owyang began his career at the Industrial and Commercial Bank in Wuhan before he was transferred to the bank's Hong Kong branch after six months. After working there for six months, he decided to return to Bangkok to seek employment in a bank there but was unsuccessful because the banks, which were mainly British and French, recruited only Western expats.

In 1923, Owyang returned to Hong Kong and succeeded in rejoining the Industrial and Commercial Bank with whom he would remain for the next seven years, rising to the position of assistant general manager of its branch in Guangzhou. However, in 1930 the bank suffered heavy losses and was forced to close, and he joined the nearby branch of China State Bank where he spent seven years, eventually being promoted to the position of general manager.

In 1937, and the outbreak of war with Japan, Owyang fled China to Hong Kong and continued there the work of China State Bank's, Guangzhou branch, until he was forced to flee again as the Japanese army approached Hong Kong, moving this time to the Philippines, where he became manager of Philippines Bank of Communications in Manila. When peace was restored in 1945, he moved back to Guangzhou.

After returning to China after the end of World War Two, Owyang decided to go to Singapore. In 1949, he opened the Overseas Union Bank with partner Lien Ying Chow with capital of only $2 million, becoming director and manager, operating from the exclusive Raffles Place. The bank specialised in financing of the rice trade between Thailand and Singapore and the business was a great success, financing 80% of the rice imports to Singapore by the mid-1950s. By the 1970s, it had grown to become one of Singapore's four biggest local banks.

Owyang spent much of his time in Thailand meeting with bankers, traders, and government ministers, developing many friendships. The prime minister of the Thai government, Kukrit Pramoj, was also deputy chairman of the Bangkok Bank of Commerce and they enjoyed good relations. In recognition of his advancement of Singapore-Thai relations he was awarded the companion of the Most Exalted Order of the White Elephant by King Bhumibol.

=== Diplomacy career ===
In 1971, aged 74, Owyang was invited to become Singapore's ambassador to Thailand, where he continued to promote strong ties between the two countries. He served for 17 years, becoming Singapore's longest serving ambassador, for which, it was reported, he received the token sum of $1 per year.

== Personal life and death ==
Chi Owyang married a teacher, the daughter of a Chinese government official, in 1927 and they had six sons and a daughter. His eldest son, Hsuan Owyang, was the chairman of the board of Housing and Development Board and CapitaLand's deputy chairman.

In November, 1988 he was admitted to St Louis Hospital, Bangkok suffering from pneumonia, having resigned as ambassador in February, and died on 25 November 1988, aged 91.
