= Cheng Tong Fatt =

Singaporean public servant, media executive and diplomat (1929–2025)

Dr. Cheng Tong Fatt
- 郑东发

Singapore Ambassador to the People's Republic of China
- In office 1991–1998
- Preceded by: Position established
- Succeeded by: Chin Siat-Yoon

Singapore Ambassador to Japan
- In office 1988–1991
- Preceded by: Lee Khoon Choy
- Succeeded by: Lim Chin Beng

Ambassador to the Republic of Korea (concurrent)
- In office 1988–1990

Permanent Secretary, Ministry of Culture
- In office 1979–1988

Chairman, Urban Redevelopment Authority
- In office 1978–1981

Director, Primary Production Department
- In office 1962–1970

Personal details
- Born: 1929 Singapore, Straits Settlements, British Malaya
- Died: 4 November 2025 (aged 96) Singapore
- Spouse: Peggy Cheng (d. 2020)
- Children: 2
- Education: University of Glasgow (B.V.Sc.); Royal College of Veterinary Surgeons
- Occupation: Civil servant, diplomat, media executive

Cheng Tong Fatt (simplified Chinese: 郑东发; traditional Chinese: 鄭東發; pinyin: Zhèng Dōngfā; 1929 – 4 November 2025) was a Singaporean public servant, media executive and diplomat.

Cheng was Singapore’s first Ambassador to the People’s Republic of China and played a key role in establishing Singapore’s ties with China, Japan, and South Korea. He was instrumental in transforming Singapore’s broadcasting landscape through the conversion of Radio Television Singapore (RTS) into the Singapore Broadcasting Corporation (SBC).

== Early life ==
Cheng was born in Singapore in 1929. He pursued higher education in the United Kingdom, graduating from University of Glasgow with a degree in veterinary science, where he became a member of the Royal College of Veterinary Surgeons (UK).

== Career ==
=== Civil career ===
In 1957, Cheng started as a veterinary officer in the Primary Production Department (PPD). In 1961, Cheng was the acting director of the PPD when the director, Tham Ah Kow, went on leave prior to retirement. In 1962, he became the Director of the PPD until 1970. In 1971, he was appointed Permanent Secretary of the Ministry of National Development.

Cheng was also appointed as Deputy Chairman and Chairman of Housing and Development Board between 1976 and 1978 and then served as the Chair of Urban Redevelopment Authority (URA) from 1978 to 1981.

In 1979, Cheng was appointed Permanent Secretary of the Ministry of Culture, which oversaw Singapore’s broadcasting entity, Radio Television Singapore. Seeing the need for reform, he started the privatisation of RTS, leading to the formation of the Singapore Broadcasting Corporation (SBC) in February 1980. He became SBC’s first General Manager and later served as Deputy Chairman from 1980 to 1988. Under his leadership, SBC expanded its programming, particularly in Chinese-language drama, and adopted commercial broadcasting practices including licence fees and advertising.

=== Diplomat ===
Cheng entered diplomatic service in 1988, when he was appointed Singapore Ambassador to Japan, with concurrent accreditation as Ambassador to South Korea from 1988 to 1990. In 1991, Singapore upgraded its diplomatic relationship with the People’s Republic of China, appointing Cheng as its first Ambassador to China, a post he held until 1998. During that posting, he helped plow the ground for bilateral cooperation, including the establishment of the Suzhou Industrial Park (SIP), Singapore’s first government-to-government project with China. After his appointment in Beijing, Cheng served as Ambassador-at-Large with the Ministry of Foreign Affairs (MFA) until his retirement in 2004.

Cheng’s public-service career spanned 47 years.

== Personal life and death ==
In 1958, Cheng married Dr. Peggy Cheng, who died in 2020, and they had a son and a daughter.

Cheng He leaves his daughter, son, daughter-in-law and two grandchildren. His wife, Peggy Cheng, died in 2020.

On 9 October 2025, Cheng suffered a stroke and was hospitalised at the National University Hospital. He was transferred to Assisi Hospice and died on 4 November at the age of 96. He left behind two children and two grandchildren.

== Honours ==
Cheng received the Public Administration Medal (Gold) in 1963 and the Meritorious Service Medal in 1970.
