= Ngiam Tong Dow =

Singaporean civil servant (1937–2020)

Ngiam Tong Dow DUBC PJG PPA(E) PBS
- 严崇涛
- Ngiam in the 1990s

Chairman of the Housing and Development Board
- In office 1 October 1998 – 30 September 2003
- Preceded by: Hsuan Owyang
- Succeeded by: Aline Wong

CEO of DBS bank
- Succeeded by: John Bolds

Personal details
- Born: 7 June 1937 Singapore, Straits Settlements, British Malaya
- Died: 20 August 2020 (aged 83) Singapore
- Spouse: Jeanette Gan Choon Neo (m. 1961)
- Children: 2
- Education: Harvard University (MPA); University of Malaya in Singapore (BA); St. Andrews School; Serangoon English School

Chinese name
- Traditional Chinese: 嚴崇濤
- Simplified Chinese: 严崇涛
Transcriptions
Standard Mandarin
- Hanyu Pinyin: Yán Chóngtāo
- IPA: [jɛ̌n.ʈʂʰʊ̌ŋ.tʰáʊ]

Ngiam Tong Dow (Note: Chinese: see Chinese name and romanisations) DUBC PJG PPA(E) PBS (7 June 1937 – 20 August 2020) was a Singaporean civil servant who was CEO of DBS bank, became the youngest permanent secretary at the age of 35, and held the position until his retirement from the civil service in 1999. He worked in various government ministries, statutory boards, and agencies, helping to shape public policies and national projects, leading to Singapore's economic growth in the first few decades after independence.

Ngiam served as the acting permanent secretary in the Ministry of Communications (1970–1972), and was promoted to be permanent secretary in the Ministry of Finance (1972–1979 and 1986–1999), Prime Minister's Office (1979–1994), Ministry of Trade and Industry (1979–1986) and Ministry of National Development (1987–1989).

He also served as chairman in several statutory boards and government-linked companies, such as the Economic Development Board (1975–1982), DBS Bank (1990–1998), Central Provident Fund (1998–2001), Housing Development Board (1998–2003), HDB Corp (2003). He was also the chief executive officer of DBS from 1991 to 1998.

== Early life and education ==
Ngiam Tong Dow was born in the Straits Settlements (present-day Singapore) on 7 June 1937 to a Hainamese family, and was the eldest among his siblings. His father, Ngiam Fook Quee, worked as an interpreter, translating English to most Chinese dialects. During the Japanese occupation of Singapore, his father quickly picked up Japanese and worked as an interpreter for the Japanese. In 1946, his father died from tuberculosis, and his mother began working as a servant to raise Ngiam and his siblings.

Ngiam received his primary education at Serangoon English School and secondary education at St. Andrew's School. Prior to starting his undergraduate studies, Ngiam worked as a journalist with The Straits Times.

In April 1959, Ngiam graduated from the University of Malaya in Singapore (now known as National University of Singapore) with a Bachelor of Arts in economics. In 1963, while serving as an economist, Ngiam was among 12 other top civil servants from Latin America, Africa, and Asia, specially selected to take a one-year course in public administration at the Harvard Graduate School of Public Administration (now known as Harvard Kennedy School). In August 1964, Ngiam topped his class by obtaining distinction in all four subjects related to public administration, and graduated with a Masters in Public Administration.

== Career ==
=== 1959–1970: Early beginnings ===
On 1 August 1959, Ngiam began his career as a civil servant in the Ministry of Commerce and Industry, before being posted as an administrative assistant to the economic development division under the Ministry of Finance after a few months. The newly created division only consisted of three other people — Minister for Finance Goh Keng Swee, permanent secretary Hon Sui Sen, and the office boy. In 1960, Ngiam provided figures for the five-year development plan, titled "State of Singapore Development Plan, 1960-1964". The plan aimed to increase employment opportunities in Singapore through a series of investments from the World Bank and the United Kingdom. In 1961, Ngiam joined Hon Sui Sen in establishing the Economic Development Board (EDB), and was quickly promoted to its chief promotions officer. Subsequently, in 1964, after graduating from Harvard University, he was promoted to serve as the land and estates manager, in charge of managing S$80 million worth of land assets under EDB, such as the Jurong Industrial Estate.

In 1968, Ngiam, together with Goh Keng Swee, initiated Singapore's first and largest purchase of gold from the Government of South Africa. Inviting the Minister of Finance Nico Diederichs to their hotel room at the sidelines of the 1968 World Bank meeting, Goh and Ngiam began negotiating a purchase of 100 tons of gold, at a fixed price of US$40, above the market price of US$35. Diederichs agreed to the deal, passed a half-sliced United States one-dollar bill to Ngiam, and instructed Ngiam to meet in Switzerland to complete the transaction. Later on, Ngiam, together with Wee Cho Yaw, managing director of United Overseas Bank, arrived at the Swiss Bank Corporation, where the banker requested Ngiam's half of the bill. As both the serial numbers on the banker's half and his half matched, Ngiam's identity was verified, and the gold purchase was completed.

=== 1970–1972: Ministry of Communications ===
In 1970, Ngiam was promoted to acting permanent secretary in the Ministry of Communications. On 28 July 1970, Ngiam led a delegation of five to the British Board of Trade, to discuss launching a regular flight service between Singapore and London, operated by Malaysia-Singapore Airlines (MSA). However, on 8 August 1970, talks between both countries broke down. In return for approval, firstly, MSA had to give a second British airline, Cathay Pacific (CPA), increased flights to Singapore and rights to fly to Australia and New Zealand via Singapore, when the first British airline, British Overseas Airways Corporation (BOAC), already had such privileges. Secondly, if MSA needed to charter aircraft to operate the Singapore-London service, only aircraft from CPA and BOAC could be chartered.

Unagreeable to the terms, Ngiam issued a statement that the landing rights of CPA and BOAC would be revoked by August 1971, if MSA was not given the rights to operate the flight service. On 28 September 1970, talks restarted at the Fullerton Building, and an agreement was reached after 10 days. MSA began operating the Singapore-London service from April 1971. On 19 October 1970, Ngiam led another delegation of four to Bern, to discuss launching a regular flight service between Singapore and Rome, operated by MSA. After five days of talks, an agreement was reached. Throughout 1971, he led various delegations to discuss and launch regular flight services from Singapore to Ceylon, Czechoslovakia, Tokyo, and North American cities via Tokyo.

Announced on 26 January 1971 by the governments of Malaysia and Singapore, MSA was split into Malaysia Airlines and Singapore Airlines. To ensure that existing services operated by MSA were not disrupted, both countries came together to discuss an air transport agreement. Ngiam led the Singapore delegation, and discussed the distribution of existing air routes and fleet of aircraft to both airlines. On 21 August 1972, at the age of 35, Ngiam was the youngest civil servant to be promoted to permanent secretary in the Ministry of Communications (now known as Ministry of Digital Development and Information). Shortly after, on 21 December 1972, he was transferred to be permanent secretary of development in the Ministry of Finance (MOF).

=== 1972–1994: Ministry of Finance, Prime Minister's Office ===
In 1973, Ngiam accompanied Minister for Finance Hon Sui Sen to represent Singapore for the first time at the General Agreement on Tariffs and Trade during the Tokyo Round, allowing Singapore to enjoy concessions on trade tariffs with other member countries. In addition to his existing portfolio, on 12 February 1979, Ngiam was appointed as permanent secretary in the Prime Minister's Office (PMO). On 22 March 1979, he was transferred from the Ministry of Finance to become permanent secretary in the newly created Ministry of Trade and Industry (MTI). On 1 April 1980, Ngiam succeeded Ridzwan Dzafir as the chairman for the watchdog committee on inflation, ensuring that shops and supermarkets cease from price gouging.

At the annual EDB dinner in November 1980, Ngiam announced that he will relinquish his role as chairman of EDB from January 1981 to P.Y. Hwang, ambassador to Belgium, after holding the position since January 1975. However, in December 1980, Minister for Trade and Industry Goh Chok Tong requested Ngiam to remain as chairman for another year, while reassuring that Hwang will be the successor. As such, Ngiam stepped down as chairman on 1 January 1982. In 1985, he was selected for the Eisenhower fellowship. While continuing as permanent secretary in PMO, Ngiam was transferred from MTI to return as permanent secretary of budget in MOF on 1 January 1987. Ngiam was also appointed as the first permanent secretary in the Ministry of National Development on 1 February 1987, before stepping down on 1 November 1989 and assuming the role of permanent secretary of revenue in MOF.

On 1 February 1990, Ngiam succeeded Howe Yoon Chong as chairman of DBS Bank, and a year later on 1 February 1991, he was promoted to chief executive officer (CEO). Under his tenure, DBS grew internationally. In 1990, DBS started a joint venture bank with Tat Lee Bank in Indonesia, and launched a full-service branch in Hong Kong. In 1992, DBS began issuing American depository receipts, bought a 10% stake in Wing Lung Bank for HK$380.7 million (S$81.3 million) and a 3.4% stake in Thai Danu Bank for S$7 million. In 1995, DBS was the first local bank to receive approval to open its first branch in Shanghai, further expanding its international footprint. On 9 May 1998, Ngiam stepped down as chairman and CEO, with S. Dhanabalan and John Olds succeeding as chairman and CEO respectively. On 12 October 1994, after more than 15 years on the job, Ngiam relinquished his position as permanent secretary in PMO.

=== 1994–2020: Later career ===
On 1 August 1998, Ngiam was appointed as chairman of the Central Provident Fund (CPF), and in October 1998, he was also appointed as chairman of the Housing Development Board (HDB). On 7 June 1999, after almost 40 years on the job, Ngiam retired from the civil service, while retaining his chairmanships at CPF and HDB. On 1 August 2001, Ngiam stepped down as chairman of CPF. During his term at HDB, Ngiam introduced various initiatives, such as the Lift Upgrading Programme and the Build-to-Order scheme. In July 2003, Ngiam stepped down as chairman of HDB, and was appointed chairman of HDB Corp (now known as Surbana Corporation), the privatised arm of HDB.

From 1999 to 2019, Ngiam served as the pro-chancellor for the National University of Singapore (NUS), and was an adjunct lecturer Lee Kuan Yew School of Public Policy from 2005 to 2017. During a dialogue session held at NUS in 2012, Ngiam urged academics to "help the State to ask the right questions" by offering their opinions on national issues, arguing that this was the key to Singapore achieving economic development. Stressing that universities should not research for the sake of doing so, he reiterated that academics across disciplines should come together to study a local issue, so that "thinkers in ivory towers" can make better decisions for Singapore.

In September 2013, Ngiam was interviewed by the Singapore Medical Association. In the interview, topics such as the Certificate of Entitlement scheme, the civil service, and his personal life were covered. When asked for his opinions on transforming Singapore into a global city, he questioned the benefit of organising the Formula One (F1) night race yearly, and believed that taxpayer money should be spent wisely and not on a frivolous expense such as F1. Ngiam also felt that ever since the salaries of ministers increased to align with the top earners in Singapore, every minister would hesitate to speak their mind. Ngiam also commented that the civil service was much tamer than in his time, and that the People's Action Party had become "too elitist" with a "lack of empathy" for the people of Singapore. On 11 October 2013, Ngiam had to clarify and retract some of the statements made during the interview, citing that he retired from the civil service in 1999 and would not have any knowledge about what happened in the civil service and government anymore.

== Personal life ==
Ngiam was a Christian. He died on 20 August 2020, after being in ill health for four and a half years. He is survived by his wife, who he had married in 1961, as well as a daughter, son, and three grandchildren.

== Bibliography ==
In 2006, NUS Press published the book A Mandarin and the Making of Public Policy: Reflections by Ngiam Tong Dow, providing his opinions and criticisms on the economic foundation laid by the founding generation of political leaders in Singapore.

- Ngiam, Tong Dow (2006). Tay, Simon S. C. (ed.). A Mandarin and the Making of Public Policy: Reflections by Ngiam Tong Dow. Singapore: NUS Press. ISBN 978-9971-69-350-3.
- Ngiam, Tong Dow (2010). Zhang, Zhibin (ed.). Dynamics of the Singapore Success Story: Insights by Ngiam Tong Dow. Singapore: Cengage Learning Asia. ISBN 978-9814-33-607-9.

== Awards and decorations ==
- Distinguished Service Order, in 1999.
- Long Service Medal, in 1995.
- Meritorious Service Medal, in 1978.
- Public Administration Medal (Gold), in 1971.
