= Tan Teck Chwee =

Singaporean teacher and businessman (1917–1988)

Tan Teck Chwee DUBC BBM
- Tan in the 1980s

Chairman of the Public Service Commission
- In office 19 June 1975 – 10 April 1988
- Preceded by: Phay Seng Whatt
- Succeeded by: Lee Hee Seng

Personal details
- Born: 1917
- Died: 10 April 1988 (aged 70–71) Singapore
- Spouse: Chong Yuet Ngan (m. 1967)
- Children: 6
- Education: Raffles College; Raffles Institution

Chinese name
- Traditional Chinese: 陳德水
- Simplified Chinese: 陈德水
Transcriptions
Standard Mandarin
- Hanyu Pinyin: Chén Déshuǐ
- IPA: [ʈʂʰə̌n.tɤ̌.ʂwèɪ]

Tan Teck Chwee (Note: Chinese: see Chinese name and romanisation) DUBC BBM (c. 1917 – 10 April 1988) was a Singaporean teacher and businessman, who served as chairman of the Public Service Commission from 1975 until his death in 1988.

== Early life and education ==
Tan attended Raffles Institution. He received a School Certificate in 1932, and a Special Certificate for Malaya with honours in 1934. He enrolled at the University of Hong Kong to study engineering, but was forced to stop due to a lack of finances. In 1936, Tan was awarded an entrance scholarship to attend Raffles College. In 1939, he obtained a Diploma in Science (Class III), and in 1940, a Diploma in Education (Pass).

== Career ==
In 1941, Tan began his career as a teacher in St Andrew's School, and later Raffles Institution. In 1956, he left and became a businessman, working in the textile industry, engineering firms, and granite quarries. In 1959, due to his experience with earthworks contracts, Tan was appointed as a commission of inquiry member to look into the capacity of the building industry, and propose possible expansions if needed.

In April 1963, Tan was appointed as a director of the newly-created Jurong Shipyard. In April 1968, he was appointed as a board member of the Public Utilities Board.

On 18 December 1970, Tan was appointed as a member of the Public Service Commission (PSC). In 1973, he became the chairman of Jurong Shipyard. On 31 May 1973, Tan announced the construction of the shipyard's third dry dock In Tanjong Kling, at a cost of more than S$30,000,000.

On 19 June 1975, Tan succeeded Phay Seng Whatt as chairman of PSC. In August 1977, after more than 200 British school teachers applied to teach in Singapore, he headed to London to interview 75 shortlisted candidates. In September 1978, Tan headed to New Zealand to interview 40 shortlisted candidates. The aim of both recruitment drives was to increase the teaching standard of English in Singapore.

In January 1981, Tan was appointed as a board member of the Monetary Authority of Singapore. In December 1981, he said that computer science was "too narrow" a discipline and that computer science students would only become programmers or computer operators. He believed that junior college students needed to study disciplines that granted broader career choices.

== Personal life ==
Tan was married to Chong Yuet Ngan, and he had four daughters and two sons. They lived in Caldecott Hill. He was admitted to the Singapore General Hospital in February 1988 and died from leukaemia on 10 April 1988.

In a condolence letter to his family, Prime Minister Lee Kuan Yew described Tan as "an outstanding Singaporean: able, upright, and many-sided in his talents and accomplishments". During the eulogy, Chief Justice Wee Chong Jin said that Tan was "a perfect example of the Confucian gentleman", as he "embodied all the virtues of Confucianism, especially gentleness, humility and compassion". On 14 April 1988, Tan was cremated at the Mount Vernon Crematorium.

== Awards and decorations ==
=== National honours ===
- Distinguished Service Order, in 1982.
- Public Service Star, in 1971.

=== Foreign honours ===
- Ordre des Palmes académiques (Officer), in 1983.

On 3 September 1985, Tan received an honorary Doctor of Laws from the National University of Singapore, for his contributions to the public service and industrialisation of Singapore.

== Legacy ==
- Tan Teck Chwee Scholarship, a scholarship offered by the National University of Singapore to undergraduates reading civil engineering. The scholarship funds, S$100,000, were donated by Jurong Shipyard and Jurong Engineering in 1988.
