= Ridzwan Dzafir =

Singaporean civil servant (1927–2011)

Ridzwan bin Haji Dzafir PJG BBM PPA(E) PPA(P) PBS KCE
- Ridzwan in 1987
- Born: 27 March 1927; Singapore, Straits Settlement, British Malaya
- Died: 28 September 2011 (aged 84); Singapore
- Education: University of Malaya in Singapore (BA); Raffles Institution
- Spouse: Mushrifah Abdul Aziz (m. 1956)
- Children: 5

Ridzwan bin Haji Dzafir PJG BBM PPA(E) PPA(P) PBS KCE (27 March 1927 – 28 September 2011) was a Singaporean civil servant who was known for his extensive experience in promoting Singapore through trade missions and meetings, earning him the nickname "Mr ASEAN".

Ridzwan served as director general of the Trade Development Board from 1983 to 1999, while serving concurrently as Singapore's first roving ambassador from 1986 to 1997.

== Early life and education ==
On 27 March 1927, Ridzwan bin Haji Dzafir was born in Singapore to a Baweanese family, and shortly after, his family moved to a rented room in a pondok. His father, Dzafir Abdul Karim, moved to Singapore from Bawean in the early 1900s, and his mother, Rugayah Khodri, was born in Singapore to a Madurese family.

Ridzwan attended Kampong Gelam Malay School, Kota Raja Malay School and Geylang Malay School, before attending Telok Kurau English School (now known as Telok Kurau Primary School). Subsequently, Ridzwan studied at Raffles Institution (RI) for his secondary education, but was soon forced into digging tunnels at Pasir Panjang Hill under the Japanese Occupation. After the war ended, he returned to RI and graduated with a Senior Cambridge in 1947.

Upon graduation, Ridzwan was awarded a Raffles College scholarship worth S$1,200, but the scholarship was withdrawn after he failed his first year of studies. Ridzwan secured a government bursary and financial assistance from his professor, Alexander Oppenheim, to continue funding his studies, and eventually graduated in 1952 with a Bachelor of Arts in economics.

== Career ==
In October 1952, Ridzwan joined the Customs Department (now known as Singapore Customs) as a junior customs officer, before being recruited to work in the trade division under the Ministry of Finance in 1961.

In 1970, Ridzwan was promoted to serve as the director of trade under the Ministry of Finance. On 14 December 1970, Ridzwan and his colleague, Athsani Karni, presented a joint paper titled "Singapore Malays and Employment", appealing to non-Malay businesses to provide more job opportunities to Malays. In the paper, Ridzwan and Athsani also suggested that there should be policies enacted to give assistance to Malays, and that these policies should be temporary and not permanent special privileges for the Malays. During his tenure, Ridzwan lead envoys to Japan, United States and Europe, with the aim of creating export opportunities for companies in Singapore.

On 1 January 1983, Ridzwan was appointed as director general of the Trade Development Board (TDB), continuing the agenda of negotiating with other countries to provide economic opportunities for Singapore. On 24 January 1986, Ridzwan was also appointed as Singapore's first roving ambassador to Argentina, Brazil, Chile and Panama, holding the position till 1996. On 4 April 1997, Ridzwan was appointed as high commissioner to Bangladesh.

From August 1986 to January 1991, Ridzwan also served as the president of the Majlis Ugama Islam Singapura (MUIS). Initially, Ridzwan requested for a term of 18 months instead of the usual three years, citing his existing responsibilities as director general of TDB and roving ambassador. However, his term was renewed three times, and eventually Ridzwan served for a total of four years and five months. During his term, Ridzwan improved the quality of operations, reorganised and corporatised the structure of MUIS. Subsequently, Ridzwan was appointed as chairman of Mendaki. With critical issues such as drug taking among Malay youths, higher failure rates of Malay pupils in school, and concentration of Malays in less-skilled jobs, Ridzwan suggested a complete restructuring of Mendaki, with proper resources and staff to establish programmes aimed at tackling these issues.

On 27 December 1991, Ridzwan was appointed as an adviser in the Council of Presidential Advisers for President Wee Kim Wee.

In 1999, Ridzwan stepped down as director general of TDB, while continuing to participate in trade missions and meetings. In total, he participated in 60 trade missions, and represented Singapore at more than 500 international conferences and meetings, earning him the nickname "Mr ASEAN".

== Personal life ==
In 1954, while Ridzwan was volunteering in the rescue section of the Civil Defence Force (CDF), he met Mushrifah Abdul Aziz, a widow with three children who was a typist at CDF. In 1956, despite objections from family members, Ridzwan married Mushrifah, and together, they had another two children.

On 28 September 2011, Ridzwan died of a heart attack after complications arising from kidney failure.

== Bibliography ==
- Ridzwan Dzafir (2009). From Pondok Boy to Singapore's 'Mr ASEAN'. Singapore: Editions Didier Millet. ISBN 978-9-8142-1760-6.

== Awards and decorations ==
- Meritorious Service Medal, in 2006.
- Order of Bernardo O'Higgins (Grand Cross), in 1996.
- Long Service Medal, in 1994.
- Public Service Star, in 1990.
- Order of the Liberator General San Martín (Grand Cross), in 1987.
- Order of the White Elephant (2nd Class), in 1984.
- Public Administration Medal (Gold), in 1981.
- Public Administration Medal (Silver), in 1968.
