= COV =

COV, Cov, CoV or Co-V may refer to:

- Cash-Over-Valuation
- City of Villains, a multiplayer online video game
- Coefficient of variation, a statistical measure
- Covariance, a measure in probability theory and statistics
- Calculus of variations, a field of mathematical analysis
- Abbreviation of Coventry, a city in the United Kingdom
  - COV, the ICAO airline designator for Helicentre Coventry, United Kingdom
  - COV, the station code for Coventry railway station
  - Coventry R.F.C., often abbreviated to just "Cov"
  - Coventry City F.C., which is also sometimes known by the shorter form
- Çukurova International Airport, an international airport in Turkey with the IATA code of COV.
- The Amtrak station code for Connellsville station, Pennsylvania, United States
- The LRT station abbreviation for Cove LRT station, Punggol, Singapore
- The NYSE abbreviation for Covidien Ltd, a medical technology and pharmaceutical company
- CoV or Co-V, an abbreviation for Coronavirus
- Cao Miao language (ISO 639 language code: cov)

== See also ==
- nCoV (disambiguation)
