= Michael Fam =

Singaporean civil engineer and businessman (1927–2014)

Michael Fam Yue Onn DUNU DUBC PJG BBM
- Fam in the 2000s

Chairman of the Housing and Development Board
- In office 2 April 1975 – 1 August 1983
- Preceded by: Lee Hee Seng
- Succeeded by: Hsuan Owyang

Personal details
- Born: Fam Yue Onn; 13 January 1927 Sandakan, North Borneo, British Empire
- Died: 27 December 2014 (aged 87) Singapore
- Spouse: Dulcie Shem (m. 1951)
- Relations: Lee Siew Choh (brother-in-law); Ivan Polunin (brother-in-law)
- Children: 2
- Parents: Fam Tain Yong (father); Yong Khyun Chin (mother)
- Education: University of Western Australia (BEng); St. Andrew's School

Chinese name
- Traditional Chinese: 範佑安
- Simplified Chinese: 范佑安
Transcriptions
Standard Mandarin
- Hanyu Pinyin: Fàn Yòuān
- IPA: [fân.jôʊ.án]

Michael Fam Yue Onn (Note: Chinese: see Chinese name and romanisations) DUNU DUBC PJG BBM (13 January 1927 – 27 December 2014) was a former Singaporean civil engineer and businessman. He is known for leading the team to complete the S$5 billion North–South and East–West lines of the Mass Rapid Transit two years ahead of schedule and within budget.

He was active in the public service and publicly listed companies, serving as chairman of the Housing and Development Board (1975–1983), Fraser and Neave (1983–2007), the Public Transport Council (1987–1989), Cold Storage (1988), Centrepoint Properties (1990–2001), Asia Pacific Breweries (1990–2008) and Singapore Airlines (1998–2001), and founding chairman of Nanyang Technological Institute (1981–1993) and the Mass Rapid Transit Corporation (1983–1991). Fam also held directorships in OCBC Bank (1989–2001), Straits Times Press Group (1974–1984) and Singapore Press Holdings (1984–2004).

== Early life and education ==
Born in Sandakan, North Borneo (present-day Sabah, Malaysia) on 13 January 1927, Michael Fam Yue Onn was the youngest child cum younger son in a family of five children, for he had three sisters and a sole older brother who died young during the war in 1943 and was a local-born Chinese of Hakka descent.

His father, Fam Tain Yong (1894–1969), had a Senior Cambridge with some accountancy training qualifications whilst his mother, Yong Khyun Chin (1896–25 December 1982), was a retired primary school teacher. In 1935, his family moved to Singapore. Fam received his early education at St. Andrew's School. In 1941, Fam graduated with a Senior Cambridge.

In January 1946, Fam was among the first two students to leave for higher studies at the University of Western Australia. Fam was obtained distinction in all subjects and in 1948, he graduated a Bachelor of Engineering in civil engineering.

== Career ==
=== Early career ===
Upon returning to Singapore in 1949, Fam started an engineering role in Hume Industries (Far East) Ltd, (Note: Acquired in 1981 by Hong Leong Group as part of a S$350 million deal.) a publicly listed company that manufactured concrete pipes, beams, and asbestos sheets. Hume was located at the 8.5 mi (13.7 km) of Bukit Timah Road, and it was listed on the Stock Exchange of Malaysia and Singapore. Throughout the years, Fam held several leadership positions, such as assistant general manager. In March 1967, Fam was promoted to general manager and director of Hume.

On 2 April 1975, Fam succeeded Lee Hee Seng as chairman of the Housing and Development Board (HDB), after being a member since 1 February 1969. In November 1975, as the request of the Monetary Authority of Singapore, Fam was also appointed as chairman of Haw Par International, which was on the verge of bankruptcy. Fam lead the negotiations for disputes with Slater Walker over a S$72.5 million loan owed by Haw Par. Eventually, in June 1976, the dispute was resolved with Slater Walker and S$23 million settlement was paid to Haw Par instead. In March 1977, Fam resigned as chairman of Haw Par, following the drop in profits of Hume.

On 1 September 1978, Fam was appointed as a director of Fraser and Neave. In October 1978, Vietnam Prime Minister Phạm Văn Đồng was brought to tour HDB flats in Toa Payoh by Fam. During the visit, Dong was impressed by the HDB flats, and requested for models and plans from Fam. In March 1980, Nepalese King Birenda and Queen Aishwarya were also brought by Fam to tour HDB flats in Toa Payoh as a part of their state visit to Singapore.

On 1 August 1981, Fam was appointed as the first chairman of the Nanyang Technological Institute (NTI). In his inaugural speech, Fam said that NTI will train experienced engineers to work in high-technology industries, and NTI lecturers and staff will be expected to be updated with latest technological developments.

=== Mass Rapid Transit Corporation (1983–1991) ===
On 1 August 1983, Fam gave up his chairmanship at HDB to become chairman at the newly formed Mass Rapid Transit Corporation (MRTC). His successor was Hsuan Owyang, deputy chairman of the Post Office Savings Bank. In 1984, as chairman of MRTC, Fam signed a S$582 million contract with Kawasaki Heavy Industries for the supply of 396 passenger train cars.

In February 1986, Fam was appointed as chairman of a committee in charge of divesting and privatising more than 500 government-owned companies. Named the Public Sector Divestment Committee, substantial shares owned by the Government in publicly listed companies, such as Singapore Airlines and DBS Bank, were divested, and profitable statutory boards, such as the Telecoms Board (now known as Singtel) and the Public Utilities Board, were privatised.

In July 1986, as chairman of MRTC, Fam announced a gratuity scheme for about 250 expatriates working in engineering and technical roles for the Mass Rapid Transit (MRT) system. As there was a cut in employer's contribution to the Central Provident Fund, expatriates found themselves receiving lesser salary than initially promised. The gratuity scheme was meant to make up for the difference. Most expatriates decided to opt for the scheme. Fam elaborated:

We can't just run the trains if there is just one link missing. Had the CPF cut been small — one to two percent — the gratuity scheme would not have been necessary. Insofar as Singaporeans are concerned, the appeal is on the basis that we are going through a rough patch. We ask you to make sacrifices now and when the good times return, all the sacrifices will be made up for. At the MRT, we do not have the ability to make up in subsequent contracts. The expatriates are here for two years; when they finish, they take their pay and go off. Whatever they lose out on, there's no possibility of recovering in subsequent contracts because there will not be any. Therein lies the uniqueness, the distinction between the MRT expatriates and all the other expatriates, whether they be in the medical service or education service...
Here's a project costing billions of dollars, we require the men in charge of this project — the payment of this project, the passing of this project, the inspection of this project — to be completely enthusiastic and dedicated to the job. If the MRT, as a national project, were to go awry, you can imagine the loss of dignity that can result to Singapore.

In response, the Workers' Party criticised the scheme, with its secretary-general J. B. Jeyaretnam questioning how Singapore would suffer any loss of dignity if the MRT was not completed on time, and said the explanation by Fam on the rationale behind implementing the gratuity scheme was not understood.

In August 1987, Fam was appointed chairman of the Public Transport Council. In November 1987, Fam and Fock Siew Wah escorted Princess Anne for an MRT ride to and from Orchard, making her the first foreign dignitary to take the MRT. Later in November, Fam and Fock also escorted Sultan of Brunei Hassanal Bolkiah for a ride, this time from Orchard to Yio Chu Kang. In less than a month later, the Sultan's brother Sufri Bolkiah tried out the MRT system together with his wife. Likewise, he was accompanied by Fam and Fock from Outram Park to Yio Chu Kang, then to City Hall.

In December 1991, Fam stepped down as chairman of MRTC, and he was replaced by Wesley D'Aranjo.

=== Later career ===
On 27 December 1991, Fam was appointed as an adviser in the Council of Presidential Advisers for presidents Wee Kim Wee, Ong Teng Cheong and S. R. Nathan.

On 11 May 1992, as chairman of Fraser and Neave, Fam signed an agreement with The Coca-Cola Company to set up a joint venture company to take over the soft drink businesses of both companies in Singapore, Malaysia and Brunei. Fam was appointed as chairman of the joint venture, named F&N Coca-Cola Pte Ltd.

In July 1993, Fam stepped down as chairman of the Nanyang Technological University council, and he was replaced by Koh Boon Hwee. In November 1994, Fam lead an independent panel to review the salary benchmarks for ministers and top civil servants. In January 1995, the panel recommended a S$1.6 million annual salary for the prime minister, pegged to twice the new salary of the Staff Grade I benchmark.

On 9 May 1998, Fam replaced S. Dhanabalan as chairman of Singapore Airlines (SIA). At the 1998 annual general meeting, Fam shared that SIA will begin selling flight tickets via the internet, complementing the existing network of travel agents and its own ticketing offices.

In July 2001, Fam retired as chairman of SIA and he was replaced by Koh Boon Hwee. In January 2006, Fam stepped down as executive chairman of Fraser and Neave (F&N), while staying on as an interim non-executive chairman. Initially reported as S$3 million, he was awarded S$4 million as a gratuity payment for his 23 years of service to F&N. Fam officially left F&N as chairman in 2007, while remaining as a consultant for the company. Succeeding the chairmanship was Lee Hsien Yang.

In January 2008, after 18 years of service, Fam stepped down as chairman of Asia Pacific Breweries.

== Personal life ==
While studying in university, Fam met Dulcie Shem (the Australian romanised form of the surname Shum), an Australian-born Chinese lass of Cantonese descent from Perth. In January 1951, Shem and her mother arrived in Singapore on MS Maetsuycker, and on 3 February 1951, Fam and Shem held their marriage at the St. Andrew's Cathedral. They have two children, a son and a daughter as well as four grandchildren.

In 1994, Fam was diagnosed with prostate cancer, and he underwent medical treatment in the United States. On 27 December 2014, Fam died. In a condolence letter address to Shem, Prime Minister Lee Hsien Loong described Fam as "a rare, selfless individual who contributed greatly to Singapore throughout his life".

== Awards and decorations ==
- Order of Nila Utama (1st Class), in 1990.
- Distinguished Service Order, in 1983.
- Meritorious Service Medal, in 1976.
- Public Service Star, in 1974.

=== Honorary degrees ===
On 3 September 1986, Fam's daughter graduated from the National University of Singapore with a law degree, and Fam was awarded an honorary Doctor of Laws degree.

On 21 February 1988, Fam was awarded an honorary Doctor of Engineering degree from the University of Western Australia. In 1993, Fam was awarded the first honorary Doctor of Letters from Nanyang Technological University.

== Legacy ==
- Michael Fam Visiting Professorship in Engineering, a professorship in Nanyang Technological University (NTU) established in 1998, is named after him.
- Michael Fam Chair Professorship in Food Science and Technology, a S$1.2 million NTU professorship established in 2014, is named after him.
