= Phay Seng Whatt =

Singaporean medical doctor (1921–2009)

Phay Seng Whatt PBC
- Phay in 1961

Chairman of the Public Service Commission
- In office 1 January 1962 – 19 June 1975
- Preceded by: Lim Eng Bee
- Succeeded by: Tan Teck Chwee

Personal details
- Born: 17 December 1921 Batu Pahat, Unfederated Malay States
- Died: 21 April 2009 (aged 87)
- Citizenship: Singapore
- Spouse: Daisy Thong Siew Chin (m. 1944)
- Children: 1
- Education: King Edward VII College of Medicine; Raffles Institution

Chinese name
- Traditional Chinese: 彭成發
- Simplified Chinese: 彭成发
Transcriptions
Standard Mandarin
- Hanyu Pinyin: Péng Chéngfā
- IPA: [pʰə̌ŋ.ʈʂʰə̌ŋ.fá]

Phay Seng Whatt PBC (17 December 1921 – 21 April 2009) was the Chairman of Public Service Commission from January 1962 to June 1975.

Trained as a medical doctor, Phay began his career as an assistant bacteriologist, before resigning in 1952 to practice medicine privately.

Phay was also chairman of Chemical Industries (Far East) Limited (1976–1987), Metal Box Singapore (1978–1989), and Malayan Breweries (1983–1990).

== Early life and education ==
On 17 December 1921, Phay was born in Batu Pahat, Unfederated Malay States.

Phay studied at Victoria School and Raffles Institution, and he obtained a Junior Cambridge in 1938 and a Senior Cambridge in 1939.

In May 1939, he was awarded a scholarship to study medicine at the King Edward VII College of Medicine. In October 1948, Phay played chess during an intra-college games week.

In June 1949, Phay qualified as medical doctor, after passing the final examination in medicine, surgery, and midwifery.

== Career ==
In July 1949, Phay was appointed as an assistant bacteriologist at Middleton Hospital, and he was paid $530 monthly. On 1 October 1951, Phay resigned from the municipal service, and joined the University of Malaya in Singapore as a tutor in clinical medicine. In 1952, he resigned to practice medicine privately.

On 15 January 1960, Phay was appointed as a member of the Public Service Commission (PSC). In February 1960, Phay recommended Kwa Soon Chuan to serve as the deputy commissioner of valuation. In December 1960, Former Minister of National Development Ong Eng Guan questioned this appointment, and suggested that Kwa was given the appointment not by merit, but because Kwa was the brother-in-law of Prime Minister Lee Kuan Yew. A Commission of Inquiry was set up to inquire the alleged nepotism. In January 1961, Phay testified that he was not influenced by any minister when he recommended Kwa for the position.

On 22 September 1961, Phay was appointed as deputy chairman of PSC. On 1 January 1962, he succeeded Lim Eng Bee as chairman. In 1971, after selecting the first batch of Singapore Armed Forces Overseas Scholarship recipients, Phay wrote to the Minister for Defence Goh Keng Swee, informing Goh of the results. Phay elaborated in his letter:

One area of misgiving which the students have is that they will not be properly utilised on their return. This is a real fear as these bright students will return under bond to a uniformed organisation, and their senior officers of lower quality may not utilise them properly. This will lead to considerable frustration. I would suggest that these scholarship students should receive your personal attention regarding their duties when they return.

On 19 June 1975, Phay stepped down as chairman of PSC, and he was succeeded by Tan Teck Chwee. From June 1976 to 30 November 1987, Phay was chairman of Chemical Industries (Far East) Limited.

On 15 November 1978, Phay was appointed as a director for Metal Box Singapore. From 29 November 1978 to 14 July 1989, he was the chairman.

On 25 January 1983, Phay was appointed as chairman of Malayan Breweries, succeeding Tan Chin Tuan. On 27 February 1990, Phay stepped down, and he was replaced by Michael Fam.

== Personal life ==
In September 1944, Phay married Daisy Thong Siew Chin, and they had a son. On 6 July 1951, Phay applied for naturalisation.

He died on 21 April 2009.

== Awards and decorations ==
- Distinguished Service Medal, in 1963.

=== Honorary degrees ===
On 22 August 1975, Phay was awarded an honorary Doctor of Letters from the University of Singapore.

== Legacy ==
- Daisy Phay–NYP Foundation Scholarship, a Nanyang Polytechnic scholarship established by the estate of Phay in 2010, with a donation of S$2.12 million.
- Daisy Phay TP Foundation Scholarship, a Temasek Polytechnic scholarship with a donation of S$2.12 million.
- Daisy Phay Foundation–RP Endowment Fund, a Republic Polytechnic endowment with a donation of S$2.12 million.
- Daisy Phay SP Foundation Award, a Singapore Polytechnic award with a donation of S$2.4 million.
- Daisy Phay Foundation Student Aid Grant, a Ngee Ann Polytechnic grant with a donation of S$2.12 million.
- Daisy Phay Foundation SHINE Scholarship
- Daisy Phay Foundation Ministry of Education Award
