= New towns of Singapore =

Administrative organization of public housing buildings

New towns of Singapore

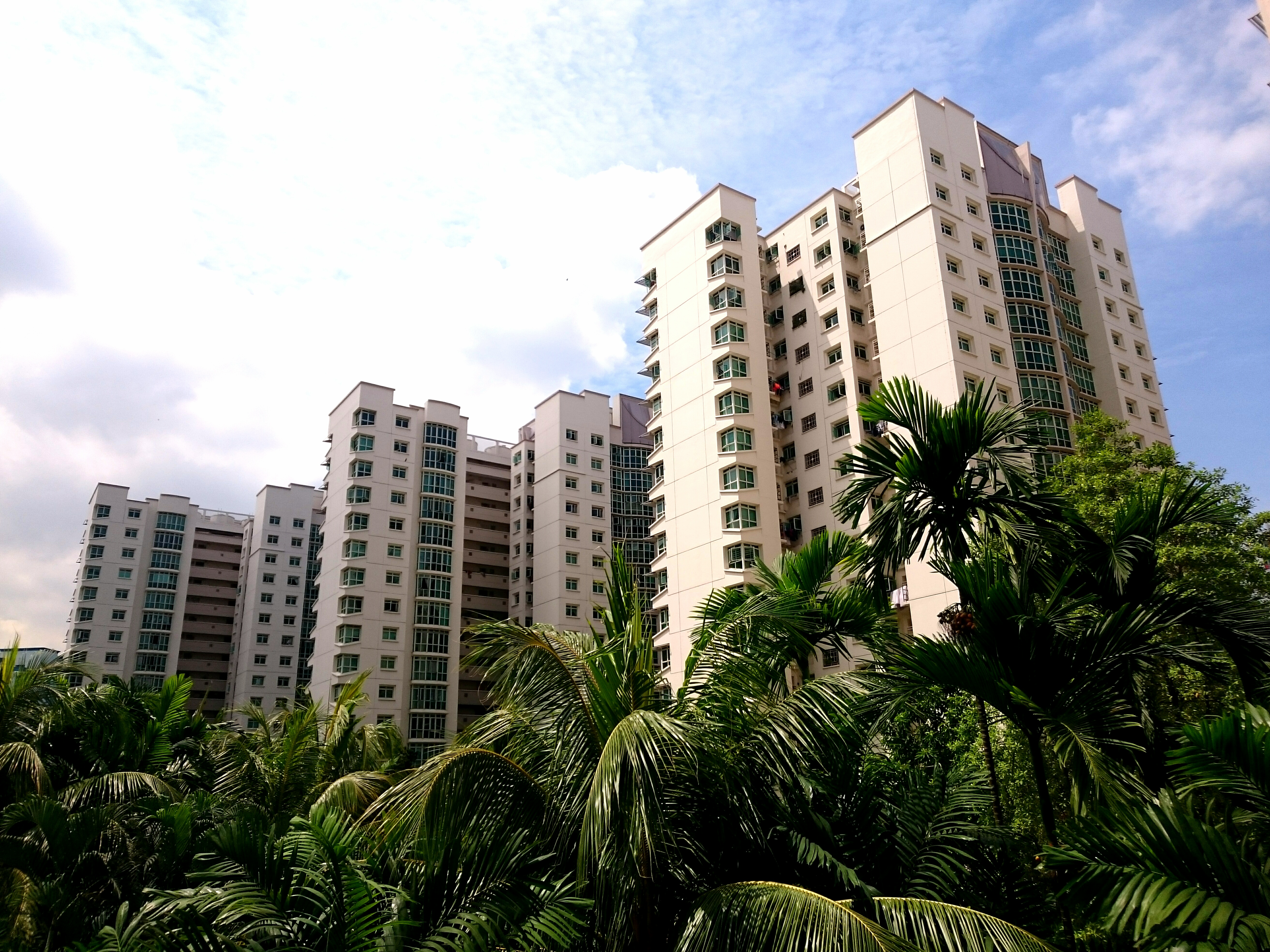
Punggol

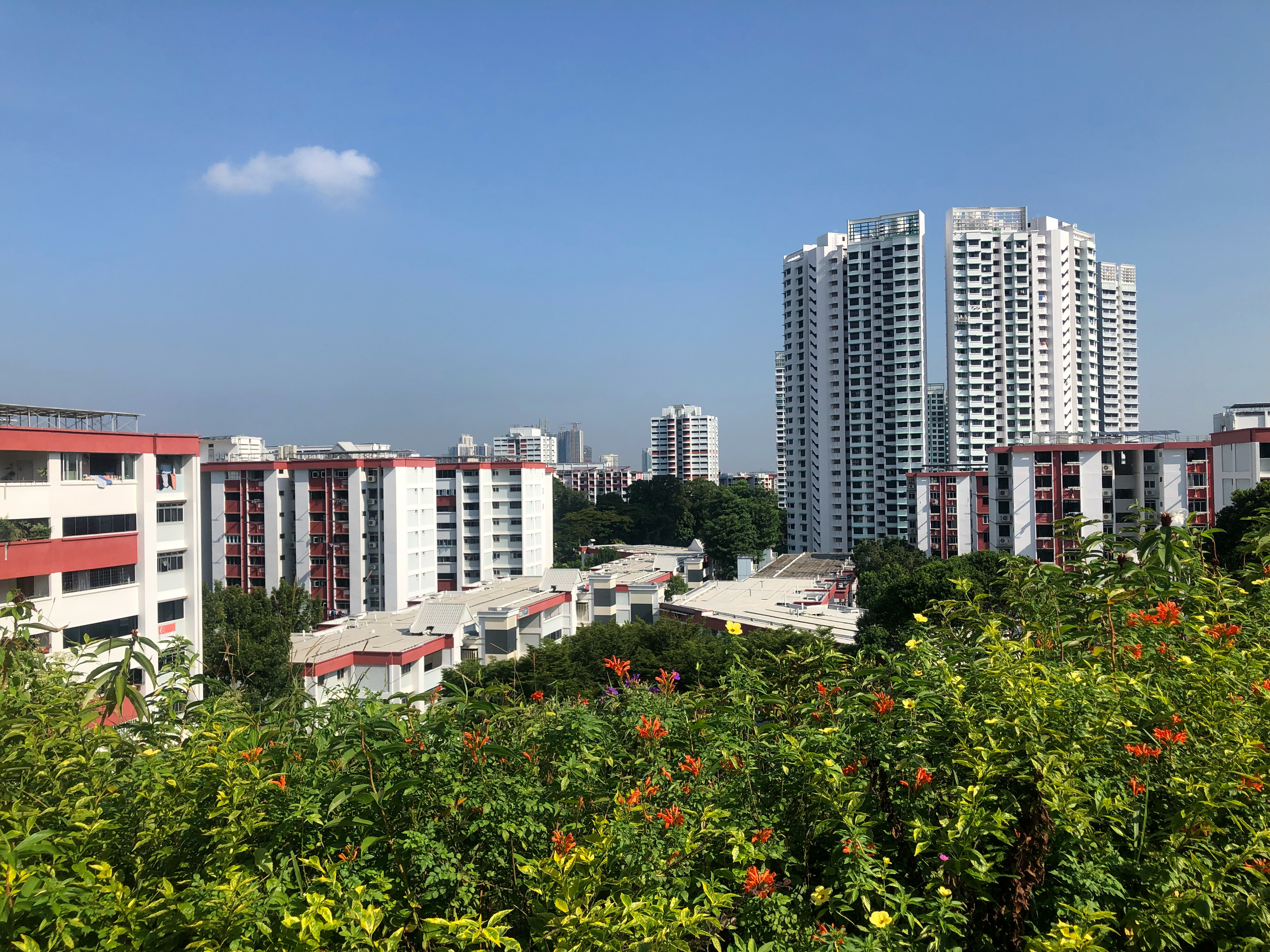
Woodlands

The new towns of Singapore are planned communities located across Singapore that are designed to be self-contained. Designed to house up to 300,000 residents, these new towns contain areas zoned for housing, recreation and employment, and are composed of multiple neighbourhoods, each of which is further subdivided into multiple precincts. Amenities in these new towns are provided through a multi-tiered system, and based on Housing and Development Board (HDB) guidelines. As of 2022, the country has 24 new towns.

The first new town in Singapore was constructed in the 1950s by the Singapore Improvement Trust (SIT), similar to British planning concepts and at low densities. Named after Queen Elizabeth II, Queenstown is Singapore's first new town with a town centre supporting seven neighbourhoods. Subsequently, after the HDB took over public housing development in the 1960s, the densities of new towns were increased and more amenities were included, and the HDB's first new town, Toa Payoh, contained industrial areas and a town centre with amenities. From the 1970s, new towns were built further from the city centre and were planned according to a new town model, containing neighbourhoods served by neighbourhood centres and a town centre for the entire town.

This new town model was revised in the late 1970s as the New Town Structural Model, introducing the concept of precincts and a "checkerboard model" in which public housing was interspersed with non-residential developments. From the 1980s, new towns incorporated larger flats, more distinctive layouts and housing block design, to cater to more affluent residents and to make the towns more unique respectively, and shopping malls were developed in town centres from the 1990s. The development of Punggol 21 saw the introduction of the Estate Model For New Town Planning, under which new towns comprised mixed-use developments connected together by a light rail system, and from the 2010s, new towns were planned with an increased focus on liveability and identity, through increased integration of technology and the use of the external environment to influence planning. In addition, design guides were introduced for each new town from 2018 in a bid to make new towns more distinctive.

The development of new towns within Singapore were in tandem with the construction of public housing in the country – managed by the Housing and Development Board (HDB) under a 99-year lease. The majority of the residential housing developments in Singapore are publicly governed and developed, and home to approximately 80% of the population. These flats which are located in these new towns are self contained with well-maintained schools, supermarkets, parks, shopping centres, healthcare services and sports and recreational facilities. Every new town consists of multiple Mass Rapid Transit stations (MRT) and bus stops that link residents to other parts of the country. Some new towns are also complemented by smaller Light Rail Transit stations (LRT).

== History ==
New town development in Singapore began with the construction of the first new town, Queenstown, by the Singapore Improvement Trust (SIT) in the 1950s. Planned along the lines of British planning concepts, the estate was initially built with a low population density. In addition, the 1958 Master Plan called for three self-sufficient new towns to be constructed outside the city centre. After the transfer of the SIT's housing responsibilities to the Housing and Development Board (HDB) in the 1960s, the population densities of planned residential areas in new towns was increased to facilitate social interaction. For that reason, plans for Queenstown were amended to increase population densities, while additional amenities were provided.

In 1965, the HDB started work on its first new town, Toa Payoh. Located about 5–8 km (3.1–5.0 miles) from the city centre, the new town contained a town centre with amenities such as shops and public transport infrastructure, along with several industrial areas to provide jobs to its residents. Multiple new towns were envisioned in the Concept Plan of 1971, surrounding the water catchment area in Singapore's centre and linked together by an expressway system and a rail network, and starting with Ang Mo Kio in 1973, new towns built in the 1970s followed a prototype new town model. This model comprised self-sufficient neighbourhoods served by neighbourhood centres, subcentres and schools, and a town centre for all the neighbourhoods in the new town. Further away from the Central Area, these new towns also included additional amenities such as sports facilities and green spaces, had little variation in terms of layout and housing block design, and distinguished between different neighbourhoods using numbering systems for roads and blocks, and through different paint schemes.

A revised new town model, termed the New Town Structural Model, was subsequently introduced in the late 1970s. This model changed the basic planning unit of new towns from the neighbourhood to the precinct, which consisted of several housing blocks and a precinct centre, in a bid to improve community cohesion. In addition, the model introduced a "checkerboard model", under which public housing developments were interspersed by non-residential areas and amenities. New town planning was further revised in the 1980s through the incorporation of larger flats to cater to the increased space demands of more affluent residents, and by increasing the variation of housing block designs and the layouts of the new towns in an attempt to give the new towns a unique character. Upgrading and redevelopment schemes were initiated in older new towns to make sure that the facilities of these areas met contemporary planning guidelines, while the upkeep and improvement of the new towns, previously under the purview of the HDB, was handled by town councils led by elected officials from 1987.

The 1990s saw the development of shopping centres in new towns across Singapore. Developed by private enterprises within the town centres of the new towns, these shopping centres offered a variety of retail shops and amenities, such as cinemas and department stores. In addition, the Estate Model For New Town Planning, a revised new town model, was introduced concurrent with the development of Punggol 21. Under this model, public housing and amenities like retail and education were consolidated into densely built developments linked by a light rail system. These developments also incorporated a shared open space called the “common green”, and were intended to foster an increased sense of community among residents.

New town planning from the 2010s had an increased focus on liveability and identity, with more green spaces and recreation facilities within the new towns, and used the existing environment around the new town to influence its design and layout. New technologies were also increasingly used through the extensive installation of monitoring systems and the use of computer models in the planning process. Moreover, the HDB made attempts to make new towns more distinctive through the introduction of design guides specific to each new town from 2018. These guides laid out specific themes for the new towns, and their respective subdivisions, for future developments to follow.

== Layout ==
Intended to function as independent communities, new towns in Singapore are based upon the provision of land for multiple uses, such as housing, recreation and employment. Generally planned to house up to 300,000 residents, they comprise multiple neighbourhoods, each with around 20,000 to 30,000 residents. Each neighbourhood is in turn divided into multiple precincts, which consist of 1,500 residents in 400 to 800 flats within several blocks. Amenities are provided at multiple levels, and according to guidelines set by the HDB.

For the provision of retail, the lowest level of provision consisted of establishments at the ground floor of housing blocks, followed by neighbourhood centres, which had a wider variety of services and markets. Town centres occupied the highest level of retail provision, containing public transport facilities such as bus interchanges and larger shops like supermarkets and department stores. Similarly, parks in new towns comprise town parks serving the entire town and neighbourhood parks for individual neighbourhoods.

== Towns and estates ==
As of 2025, there are 24 towns and 3 estates across Singapore. These statistics reflect the boundaries of HDB towns and are not necessarily the same as planning area statistics.

=== Towns ===
Name (English/Malay)	Chinese	Pinyin	Tamil	Total area (km2)	Residential area (km2)	Dwelling units	Projected ultimate	Population
Ang Mo Kio	宏茂桥	Hóngmàoqiáo	ஆங் மோ கியோ	6.38	2.83	50,726	58,000	138,200
Bedok	勿洛	Wùluò	பிடோ	9.37	4.18	62,816	79,000	187,900
Bishan	碧山	Bìshān	பீஷான்	6.90	1.72	20,072	34,000	61,100
Bukit Batok	武吉巴督	Wǔjíbādū	புக்கிட் பாத்தோக்	7.85	2.91	44,285	54,000	121,400
Bukit Merah	红山	Hóngshān	புக்கிட் மேரா	8.58	3.12	54,227	68,000	141,400
Bukit Panjang	武吉班让	Wǔjíbānràng	புக்கிட் பாஞ்சாங்	4.89	2.19	35,325	44,000	118,900
Choa Chu Kang	蔡厝港	Càicuògǎng	சுவா சூ காங்	5.83	3.07	48,900	62,000	167,200
Clementi	金文泰	Jīnwéntài	கிளிமெண்டி	4.12	2.03	26,730	39,000	69,500
Geylang	芽笼	Yálóng	கேலாங்	6.78	2.14	30,892	50,000	86,000
Hougang	后港	Hòugǎng	ஹவ்காங்	13.09	3.67	57,272	72,000	179,700
Jurong East	裕廊东	Yùlángdōng	ஜூரோங்	3.84	1.65	24,122	31,000	75,400
Jurong West	裕廊西	Yùlángxī	ஜூரோங்	9.87	4.80	75,208	94,000	253,800
Kallang/Whampoa	加冷/黃埔	Jiālĕng/Huángpǔ	காலாங்	7.99	2.10	39,931	57,000	105,200
Pasir Ris	巴西立	Bāxīlì	பாசிர் ரிஸ்	6.01	3.18	29,654	44,000	106,600
Punggol	榜鹅	Bǎng'é	பொங்கோல்	9.57	3.74	50,663	96,000	146,900
Queenstown	女皇镇	Nǚhuángzhèn	குவீன்ஸ்டவுன்	6.94	2.10	33,164	60,000	81,200
Sembawang	三巴旺	Sānbāwàng	செம்பவாங்	7.08	3.31	30,020	65,000	81,500
Sengkang	盛港	Shènggǎng	செங்காங்	10.55	3.97	69,196	96,000	217,700
Serangoon	实龙岗	Shílónggāng	சிராங்கூன்	7.37	1.63	21,632	30,000	66,800
Tampines	淡滨尼	Dànbīnní	தெம்பினிஸ்	12.00	5.49	72,683	110,000	232,700
Tengah	登加	Dēngjiā	தெங்கா	7.00	–	14,000	42,000	34,340
Toa Payoh	大巴窑	Dàbāyáo	தோ பாயோ	5.56	2.48	39,737	61,000	103,800
Woodlands	兀兰	Wùlán	ஊட்லண்ட்ஸ்	11.98	4.80	69,900	102,000	243,300
Yishun	义顺	Yìshùn	யீஷூன்	7.78	3.98	65,158	84,000	198,500

=== Estates ===
Name (English/Malay)	Mandarin	Pinyin	Tamil	Total area (km2)	Dwelling units	Population
Bukit Timah	武吉知马	Wūjízhīmǎ	புக்கித் திமா	17.53	2,423	8,100
Marine Parade	马林百列	Mǎlínbǎiliè	மரின் பரேட்	6.12	6,537	20,800
Central Area	新加坡中区	Xīnjiāpōzhōngqū	சிங்கப்பூர் மாவட்டம்	17.84	12,571	27,200

== See also ==
- Cash-Over-Valuation
- Housing and Development Board
- Public housing in Singapore
