= Wong Ngit Liong =

Wong Ngit Liong DUBC
- Education: University of Malaya
- Occupation: Technology entrepreneur
- Years active: 1961–present
- Known for: Venture Corporation and National University of Singapore
- Spouse: Tan Siew Hoon

Wong Ngit Liong DUBC (born November 1941) is the Executive Chairman of Venture Corporation which he founded in 1984. In 2018, Venture Corporation had 15,000 employees.

== Education and early career ==
Wong holds a bachelor's degree in Electrical Engineering from the University of Malaya, a master's degree in Electronics Engineering from the University of California, Berkeley and a Master of Business Administration degree from McGill University. Wong spent the first 12 years of his career with Hewlett-Packard (HP) where he held various management positions at HP headquarters in Palo Alto, California, was actively engaged in the start-up of HP Singapore, and was the founding Director and General Manager of HP Malaysia.

== Honors ==
Wong was Chairman of the Board of Trustees of the National University of Singapore from 2004 to 2016. During his tenure as Chairman, the National University of Singapore was transformed from a local teaching institution dedicated to manpower development into a university which has been ranked as the 22nd best university in the world. In 2012, Wong was awarded a Meritorious Service Medal at the National Day Awards by the President of the Republic of Singapore. In 2018, he was awarded the Distinguished Service Order.

Wong has served on the Economic Development Board of the Government of Singapore. Ernst and Young Singapore honored Wong as its Entrepreneur of the Year in 2002.
