= Cash-Over-Valuation =

Cash-Over-Valuation, or COV for short as it is commonly known in Singapore, was a prevalent feature in the resale market for HDB (Housing Development Board) flats in Singapore for years until it was reviewed on 10 March 2014.

COV can be defined as the difference between the resale price and the market value of the flat (HDB) that is paid by the buyer upfront.

Before 10 March 2014, a HDB resale flat begins with a professional valuation to discover the worth of the flat. The seller and buyer will negotiate about the amount to be paid above the valuation. This amount is the COV. The selling price will thus be the valuation plus COV.

If the flat is sold at valuation or below, no COV is paid.

However, COV has often been accused of causing volatility in the HDB resale flat market and sharp price hikes.

Currently, HDB will accept valuation requests only from buyers or their salespersons, after the buyers have been granted an Option to Purchase by the flat sellers.

== See also ==
- Public housing in Singapore
- Public housing precincts in Singapore
- Housing and Development Board
- New towns of Singapore
- Executive Condominium
- Housing and Urban Development Company (HUDC) Flats
