= Decision paralysis =

Decision paralysis may refer to:

- Analysis paralysis, a process where overanalyzing a situation delays decision-making.
- Overchoice, the phenomenon that choosing between a large variety of options can be detrimental to decision-making.
- Decision fatigue, the deteriorating quality of decisions made by an individual after a long session of decision making.
