= Lien Ying Chow =

Singaporean businessperson (1906–2004)

George Lien Ying Chow PJG TM
- Lien in 1989
- Born: Lien Ying Chow; 2 August 1906; Dabu, Guangdong, China
- Died: 6 August 2004 (aged 98)
- Occupation: Businessman
- Known for: Founder of Overseas Chinese Union Bank

Chinese name
- Traditional Chinese: 連瀛洲
- Simplified Chinese: 连瀛洲
Transcriptions
Standard Mandarin
- Hanyu Pinyin: Lián Yíngzhōu
- IPA: [liǎn.ǐŋ.ʈʂóʊ]

George Lien Ying Chow PJG TM (2 August 1906 – 6 August 2004) was a Singaporean businessperson. He is one of the founders of Overseas Chinese Union Bank (later known as Overseas Union Bank), which merged with United Overseas Bank in 2001.

== Early life ==
Lien was born on 2 August 1906 in the village of Dabu, Guangdong, China, becoming an orphan at the age of ten. Around the age of fourteen, Lien immigrated to Singapore, with little money to spare. In 1928, some eight years after reaching Singapore, Lien founded his own trading company, Wah Hin and Company, using his savings.

== Career ==
Lien was given the role of president of the Singapore Chinese Chamber of Commerce in 1941. Also a food and drink supplier to the British Army, he fled by boat to Australia, a few days before the Japanese occupation of Singapore. Singapore's Mandarin Hotel belonged to him. During the 1960s, Lien was the High Commissioner of Singapore to Malaysia. Lien cofounded Nanyang University and is the founder of Overseas Union Bank (formerly Overseas Chinese Union Bank), which, in 2001, became part of United Overseas Bank, as well as the Lien Foundation, which he established in 1980. He was winner of the American Academy of Achievement's Golden Plate Award in 1981.

Lien was appointed first chairman of the Preservation of Monuments Board in 1972, a statutory board of the Ministry of National Development.

== Personal life ==
Lien was acquainted with Tunku Abdul Rahman, then-Prime Minister of Malaysia. The duo were said to be "good friends". He also had ties with the royal family of Thailand as well as a number of Thai officials.

Lien was married four times. His first wife, Wee Siew Kim, died. His marriages to Mok Mei Lan and Kay Leong ended in divorce. In 1964 Lien married Margaret Chan Wen Hsien, and he predeceased her. He had eight children (four daughters and four sons). Wee Siew Kim was the mother of seven of them, and the last was by Mok Mei Lan.

== Death ==
Lien died on 6 August 2004, aged 98. The cause of his death was pneumonia. Lien was described by Ming San Tee as "[t]he business kingpin known by households", while the Los Angeles Times wrote that he was a "self-made Singapore banking tycoon".

== Awards and decorations ==
- Meritorious Service Medal, in 1964.
- Order of the Crown of Thailand (Third Class), in 1965.

== Legacy ==
- In February 2016, Singapore's Mediacorp airs Men With A Mission, an SG50 documentary series that profiles five influential men who helped propel the rise of modern Singapore: Yusof Ishak, George Bogaars, Hon Sui Sen, Lien Ying Chow and S Rajaratnam.
- Lien Ying Chow Drive, a road in Nanyang Technological University, is named after him.
- Lien Ying Chow Library, a library in Ngee Ann Polytechnic, is named after him.

== Bibliography ==
- Hamilton-Hart, Natasha (2003). Asian States, Asian Bankers: Central Banking in Southeast Asia. NUS Press. ISBN 9789971692704.
