= Serangoon Secondary School =

Coordinates: 1°22′30″N 103°54′08″E

- 实仁中学; Sekolah Menengah Serangoon

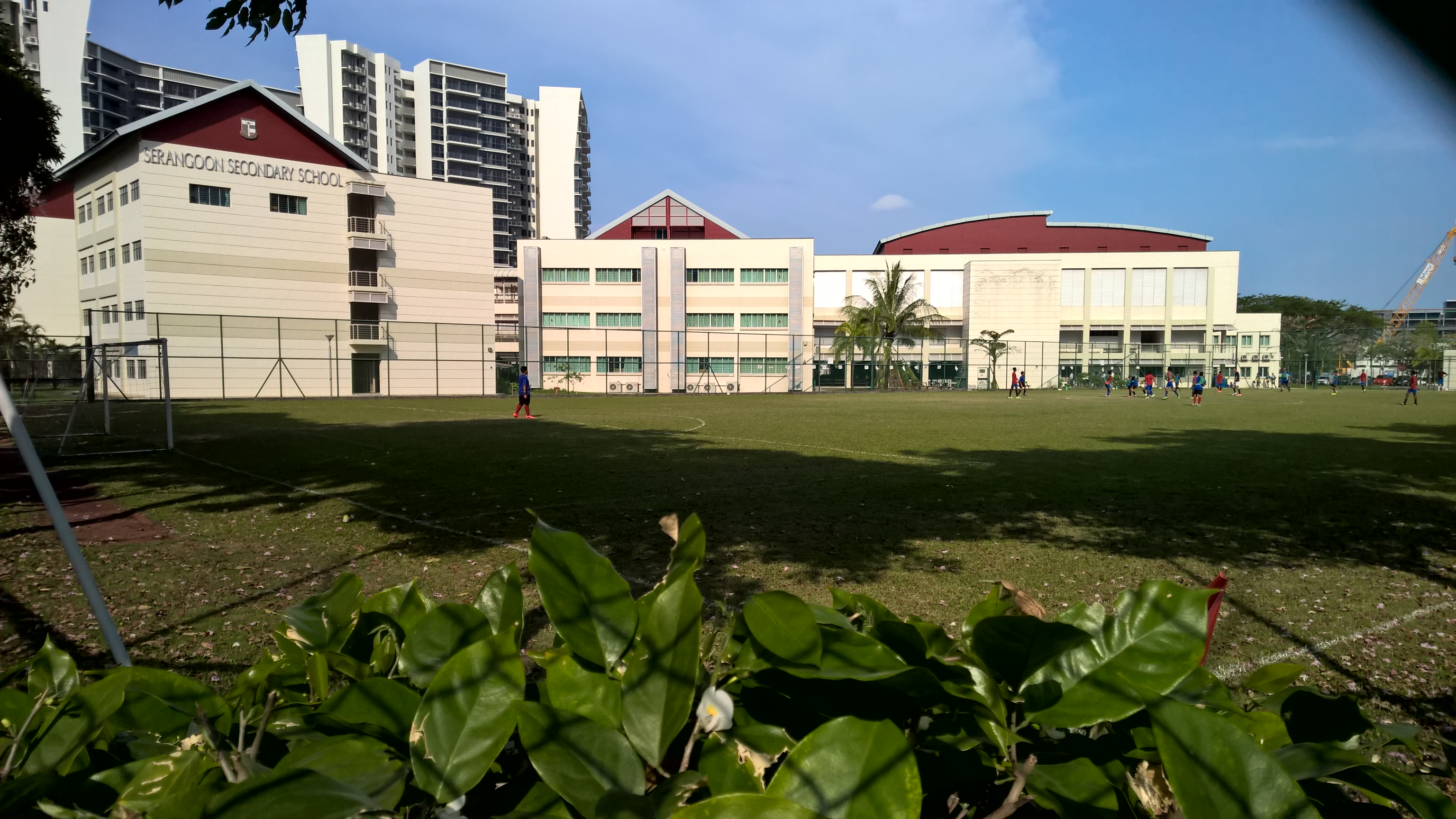

Location
- 11 Upper Serangoon View; Singapore 534237; Singapore

Information
- Type: Government
- Motto: "Seek, Strive, Serve"
- Established: 1928; 98 years ago
- Session: single
- School code: 3010
- Principal: Chen Fook Pang
- Colour: Blue White Orange
- Website: serangoonsec.moe.edu.sg

Serangoon Secondary School (SSS), formerly known as Serangoon English School, is a government secondary school in Upper Serangoon View, Singapore.

== History ==
=== Serangoon English School (1928-1967) ===
SSS started as Serangoon English School in 1928, housed in a two-storey building in Simon Road. At that time, it had only seven classes with a head-mistress and seven teachers. It was the only government co-educational school in the Colony of Singapore then and also a feeder school to Raffles Institution.

In 1937, the school added three standards, providing education up to Secondary Three in present-day terms. The students who successfully completed Standard Eight then went on to Raffles Institution and Raffles Girls' School respectively. With the formation of the first School Certificate class in 1949, the school became a full school offering education from Primary One to Cambridge School Certificate.

In 1958, the school became a secondary school and seven years later, the first Pre-University class was formed. This section was soon expanded to include two Pre-University One classes and two Pre-University Two classes.

=== Serangoon Secondary School (1967-present) ===
The school shifted to Lowland Road in 1967 and also changed its name to Serangoon Secondary School. In 1976, owing to the establishment of Junior Colleges for Pre-University students, the Pre-University section of SSS was closed. In 2001, SSS moved to its present premises at 11 Upper Serangoon View.

The Parade Square at Serangoon Secondary School

SSS has numerous CCAs. It also has a niche for its uniformed groups. All of its uniformed groups have attained the gold award for the Best Unit every year from 2008 onwards.

In 2008, the principal was Mr Yeo Kuerk Heng.

== Identity and culture ==
=== School crest ===
- Blue signifies piety and sincerity
- White embodies pure and wholesome, purity in thought, word and deed
- Orange represents strength, integrity and endurance
- 'The Eagle' symbolises self-discipline, dignity, esteem and power.
- The lamp - symbolises knowledge.

=== Campus ===
The campus is split into blocks A to H, which surround the parade square.

Block A: General Office, Staff Rooms

Block B: Canteen, Hall

Block C: Library, IT Labs and Rooms, Music Room, Mobile Robotics Room

Block D: Chemistry/Physics/Biology Labs, Art Rooms

Block E: D&T Rooms, F&N Kitchens

Blocks F, G, H: Classrooms

== Subjects offered ==
At the Upper Secondary Level, students get to choose the subjects they want to take, with the inclusion of some compulsory subjects.

- English Language
- Mother Tongue Language
- Third Languages
- Science
- Science (Physics, Chemistry)
- Science (Chemistry, Biology)
- Physics
- Chemistry
- Biology
- Mathematics
- Additional Mathematics
- Principle of Accounts
- Humanities (Social Studies, Geography)
- Humanities (Social Studies, History)
- History
- Computing
- Design and Technology
- Food and Nutrition
- Mobile Robotics
- Art
