= Housing and Development Board =

Singaporean public housing statutory board

Housing & Development Board (HDB)

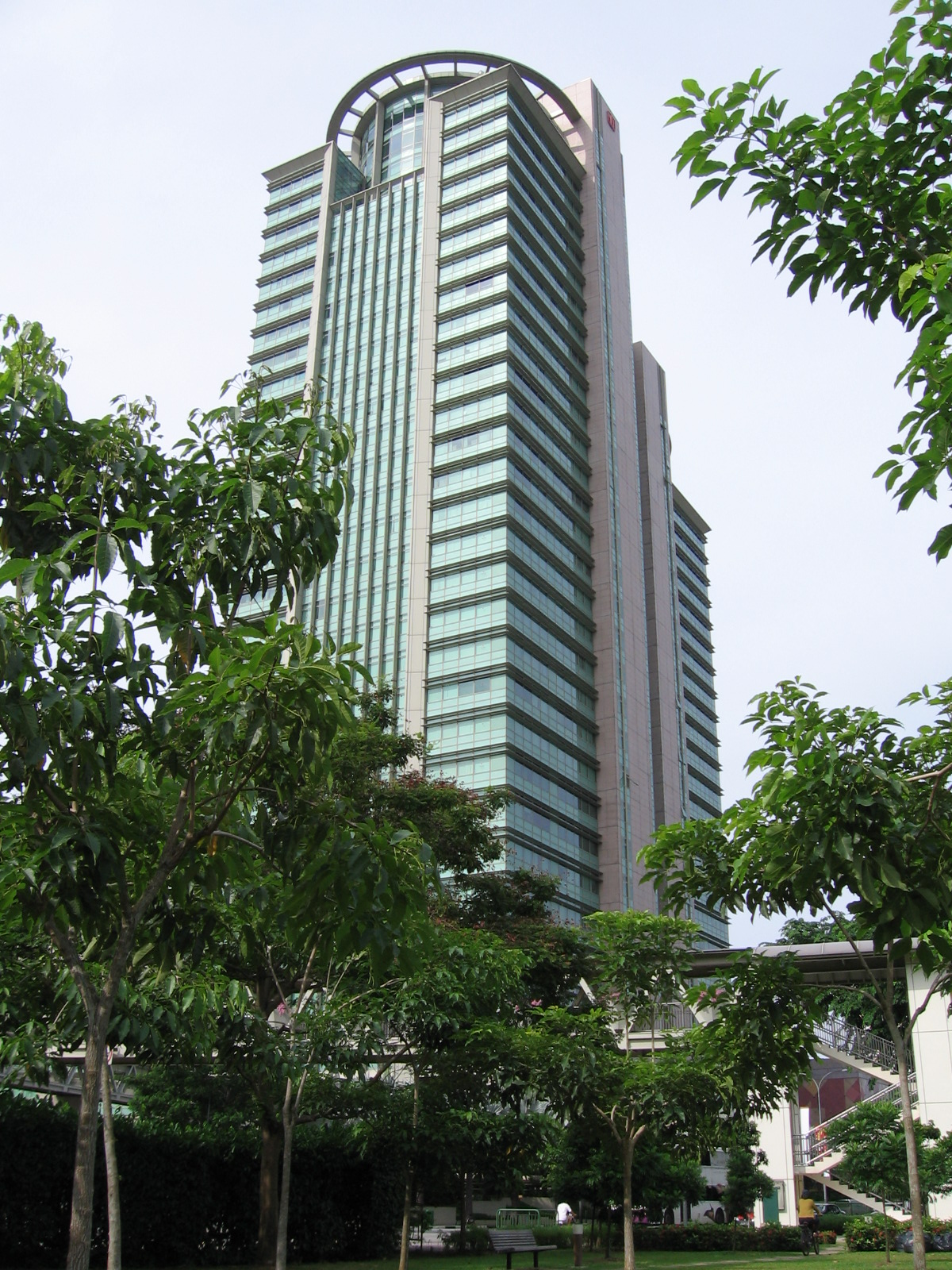
- The HDB Hub at Toa Payoh, headquarters of the Housing & Development Board of Singapore.

Agency overview
- Formed: 1 February 1960; 66 years ago
- Preceding agency: Singapore Improvement Trust
- Jurisdiction: Government of Singapore
- Headquarters: HDB Hub, 480 Lorong 6 Toa Payoh, Singapore 310480
- Agency executives: Benny Lim (Chairperson); Tan Meng Dui (CEO)
- Parent agency: Ministry of National Development
- Website: www.hdb.gov.sg
- Agency ID: T08GB0018F

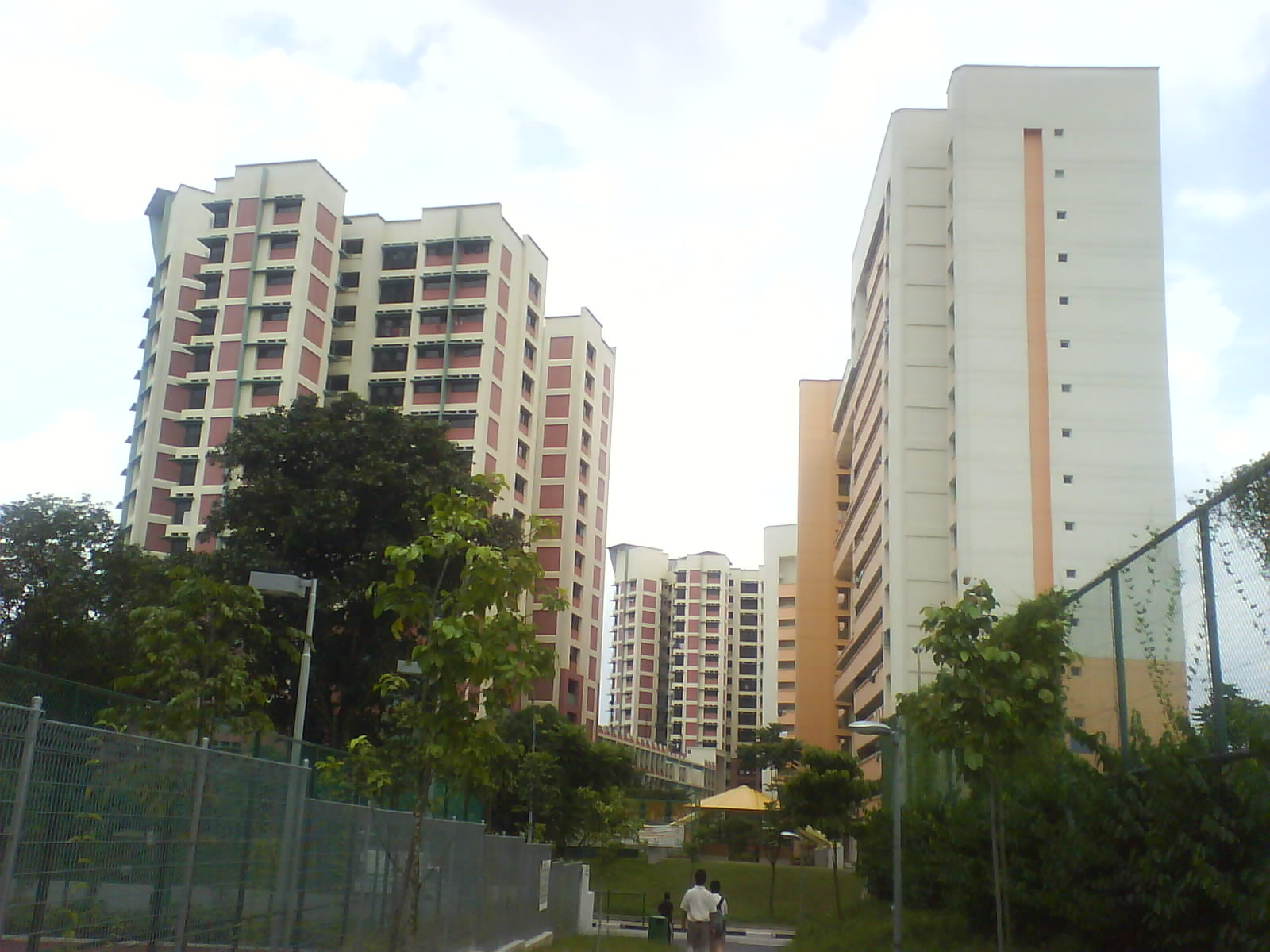
HDB flats in Jurong West

The Housing & Development Board (Note: Chinese: 建屋发展局; pinyin: Jiànwū fāzhǎnjú; Malay: Lembaga Pembangunan dan Perumahan; Tamil: வீடமைப்பு வளர்ச்சிக் கழகம், romanised: Vīṭamaippu vaḷarccik kaḻakam) (HDB), often referred to as the Housing Board, (Note: Sources using the term "Housing Board" include the following:) is a statutory board under the Ministry of National Development (MND) that is responsible for public housing in Singapore. Established in 1960 as a result of efforts in the late 1950s to set up an authority to take over the Singapore Improvement Trust's (SIT) public housing responsibilities, the HDB focused on the construction of emergency housing and the resettlement of kampong residents into public housing in the first few years of its existence.

Focus shifted in the late 1960s as the HDB began building flats with better fittings and offering them for sale. Starting in the 1970s, the board initiated efforts to improve community cohesion and solicit resident feedback. In the late 1980s, town councils were established to manage common property and oversee day to day maintenance. During the 1990s and 2000s, the HDB introduced redevelopment schemes for mature estates along with new housing types designed for various income groups in partnership with private developers.

The HDB was reorganised in 2003 to better suit the housing market. Resident engagement regarding upgrading schemes increased throughout the 2000s and 2010s, and the board began solar panel installations in the early 2010s. Since the turn of the century, HDB designs have moved away from simple or brutalist styles toward improved contemporary aesthetics with improved amenities and facilities.

The HDB consists of a 12-member board and three departments, the Building, Estate and Corporate departments. Besides the provision of public housing, the HDB also handles land reclamation works in Singapore and maintains the infrastructure of Singapore's national resource stockpiles. It is also a major purchaser of state land from the Government with the purchase price payable by HDB going into the past reserves.

== History ==
=== Background and formation ===
By the 1940s and 1950s, Singapore experienced rapid population growth, with the population increasing to 1.7 million from 940,700 between 1947 and 1957. The living conditions of people in Singapore worsened, with many people living in informal settlements or cramped shophouses. Moreover, the Singapore Improvement Trust (SIT), which was then responsible for public housing in Singapore, faced many problems in providing public housing, with the rents for flats being too low to be financially sustainable but unaffordable for many of the poorer people in Singapore. Delays in approval for new housing developments greatly slowed housing construction by 1958.

In the mid-1950s, in light of the findings of the Committee on Local Government, the government initiated efforts to set up a new housing authority in place of the SIT. These efforts culminated in the Housing and Development Bill, which was read to the Legislative Assembly in 1958 and passed the next year. With the bill's passing, the HDB was formed in February 1960, taking over the SIT's public housing responsibilities.

=== The 1960s to 1980s ===
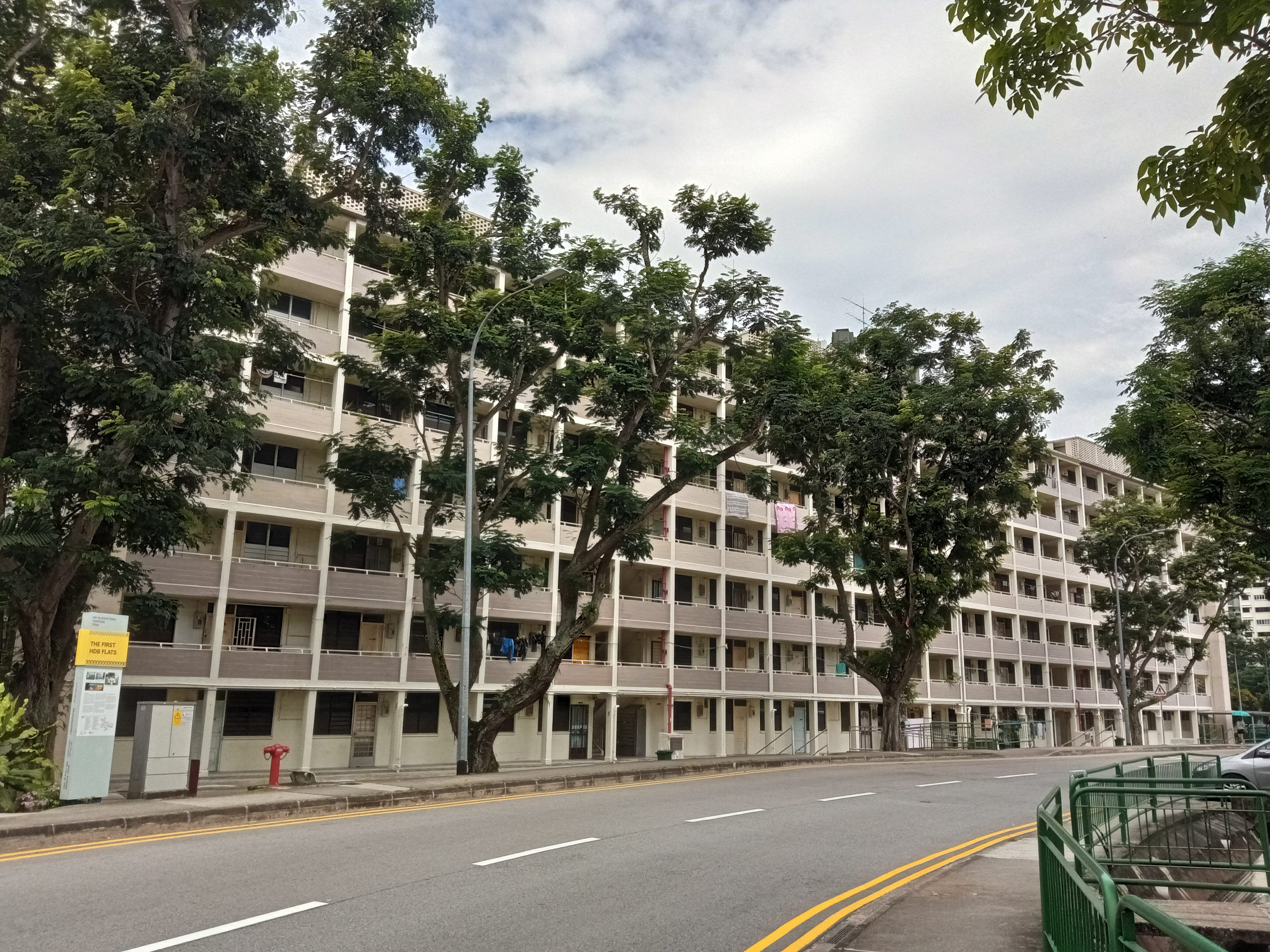
One of the original HDB flats constructed in 1960, in July 2021.

On the Housing & Development Board (HDB)'s formation, it announced plans to build over 50,000 flats, mostly in the city, under a five-year scheme, and found ways to build flats as cheaply as possible so that the poor could afford to stay in them. The HDB also continued the SIT's efforts in building emergency flats in Tiong Bahru, which were mostly used to rehouse people displaced by the Bukit Ho Swee fire in May 1961. After the fire, the HDB focused its efforts on Bukit Ho Swee's redevelopment, rapidly designing and constructing a public housing estate on the fire's site, with people displaced by urban renewal projects and kampong fires rehoused in the estate's flats. Their occupants disliked the one-room emergency flats, so by the mid-1960s, the HDB had moved on to building larger flats, especially around the Central Area. Nevertheless, the Bukit Ho Swee estate marked the beginning of the HDB's resettlement efforts, and kampong dwellers were swiftly rehoused in public housing. By 1965, 54,430 flats had been built, with an increasing proportion of the population living in HDB dwellings.

The rehousing of kampong dwellers allowed the HDB to pursue its redevelopment plans for the Central Area, and the Urban Renewal Department was formed within the HDB in 1966 to manage the redevelopment works. This department also handled the construction of new amenities in the Central Area and collaborated with private enterprises in constructing new buildings on cleared sites. However, by the 1970s, the urban renewal projects proved too large for the department to handle alone, so the Urban Redevelopment Authority, a statutory board, replaced the department in 1974.

With the construction of the Bukit Ho Swee estate, the HDB also sought to change how estate residents behaved, and to give the state greater control over their lives. Moreover, with the new housing estates not segregated by race, the HDB facilitated the formation of multiracial communities in place of racially divided ones. Nevertheless, by the 1980s, racial divisions within HDB estates became increasingly pronounced, so to mitigate possible ethnic tensions, the Ethnic Integration Policy, which capped the racial proportions of residents in HDB estates, was introduced in 1989.

The HDB began offering flats for purchase in 1964, but as many flat dwellers at the time could not afford to do so, it was initially not very successful. Applicants could use their Central Provident Fund (CPF) contributions to pay for their flats beginning in 1968. The take-up rate for flat purchases increased such that by the 1980s, most flat applicants were opting to purchase them. From the late 1960s onwards, the HDB designed flats and estates with improved amenities and fittings to improve the quality of life. To further these efforts, in the 1970s and 1980s, the HDB introduced residents committees in its housing estates to promote community cohesion, loosened regulations on flat modifications, and engaged in upgrading works. These works included the expansion of old one-room flats and the construction of new amenities in older estates. In addition, the HDB started soliciting feedback from residents through the Sample Household Surveys (SHS) from 1975.

In 1982, control over the Housing and Urban Development Company (HUDC) was transferred to the HDB. With the prices of HUDC flats approaching those of private housing, and the middle class being able to purchase HDB flats, the HDB stopped building HUDC flats in 1985.

=== 1990s to present ===
In a bid to encourage younger people to continue living in older public housing estates, the HDB announced a large-scale upgrading scheme for those estates in 1989. Known as the Main Upgrading Programme, it attempted to improve these estates by adding new facilities to these estates, improved fittings in flats and varying the looks of the housing blocks in different precincts. In addition, the HDB initiated a redevelopment programme, the Selective En bloc Redevelopment Scheme (SERS) in 1995, in which selected housing blocks were razed and their residents compensated. SERS carried out renewal schemes in town centres in several older estates in the late 1990s. There have been a total of 81 SERS sites as of 2018.

Along with the upgrading schemes, the HDB introduced several new housing schemes in the 1990s. These included the Design and Build and Design Plus schemes, with flats designed in collaboration with private architects and built to a higher standard than other flats, and executive condominiums, with amenities similar to private housing. Further schemes were introduced in the 2000s, such as Build-to-Order (BTO), in which construction of flats began only after applicants had applied for them, and the Design, Build and Sell Scheme, in which the flats were developed and sold by private developers.

In November 2007, HDB introduced the Sales of Balance scheme (SBF), a scheme to sell unsold flats from previous BTO launches, Selective En bloc Redevelopment Scheme (SERS) projects, and other sources on a yearly basis. It was to replace the Walk-in Selection (WIS) exercises which was held irregularly. From 2011, the scheme's frequency doubled to twice a year to meet buyers' demand for flats.

Nevertheless, the HDB was unable to adapt to the changes in Singapore's housing market fast enough in the early 2000s. To determine and redefine its position in the housing market, the HDB was reorganised, transferring the provision of flat loans to private banks, and corporatising its Building and Development Division to form a new subsidiary, HDB Corp.

The HDB increased efforts to engage residents in its provision of public housing in the 2000s. These efforts included public consultation schemes and the Neighbourhood Renewal Programme, in which facilities within multiple adjacent precincts were improved or upgraded, and residents were able to provide feedback on the planned improvements. Efforts to foster more extensive resident participation were made in 2013 with the Building Our Neighbourhood Dreams! project, in which residents could propose neighbourhood improvements instead of just providing feedback, but the initial projects were not well received.

The HDB began installation of solar panels on public housing blocks and in its properties in the 2010s. In 2014, together with the Economic Development Board, it initiated the SolarNova programme to handle solar panel installation on government properties and buildings.

In February 2019, HDB announced that starting from the middle of 2019, flat buyers will be able to apply for unsold BTO flats online anytime on a first-come, first-served basis, and book a flat by the next working day. This was intended to help citizens with an urgent need for housing.

== Responsibilities ==
Under the Housing and Development Act, the HDB is tasked to plan and carry out the construction or upgrading of any building, clear slums, manage and maintain the estates and buildings that it owns, and to provide loans to people to buy land or public housing. The HDB also carries out land reclamation works and handles the infrastructure for Singapore's national resource stockpiles.

== Organisation ==
The HDB consists of a chairman and 11 other members, along with three departments, the Building, Estate and Corporate departments, under the purview of a chief executive officer, who is a member of the board. Each department is further subdivided into different groups. The Research and Planning, Development and Procurement, Building Quality and Building and Infrastructure groups and the Building and Research Institute are under the Building department; the Estate Administration and Property, Housing Management, Community Relations and Properties and Land groups under the Estate department; and the Corporate Development, Corporate Communications, Finance, Information Services and Legal groups under the Corporate department.

The HDB also controls 75% of EM Services, a company handling the upkeep of the HDB's housing estates and properties, and the properties of other public organisations. HDB employees are organised under a house union, the HDB Staff Union (HDBSU).

== Membership ==
=== Chairmen ===
List of chairmen with years served
Name	Years served	Notes
Lim Kim San	1960–1963	
Tan Kia Gan	1963–1966	
Howe Yoon Chong	1966–1969	
Pang Tee Pow	1969–1970	
Lee Hee Seng	1971–1975	
Michael Fam	1975–1983	
Hsuan Owyang	1983–1998	
Ngiam Tong Dow	1998–2003	
Aline Wong	2003–2007	
James Koh Cher Siang	2007–2016	
Bobby Chin	2016–2023	
Benny Lim Siang Hoe	2023–present	

=== Chief executives ===
List of chief executives with years served
Name	Years served	Notes
Howe Yoon Chong	1960–1961	
S. Thiruchelvam	1961–1964	
Tan Kah Jin	1964–1965	
Lim Phai Som	1965–	
Teh Cheang Wan (acting)	1968–1970	
Teh Cheang Wan	1970–1979	
Liu Thai Ker	1979–1989	
Chuang Kwong Yong	1989–1990	
Lim Hng Kiang	1991	
Moh Siew Meng	1991–1995	
Tan Guong Ching	1995–2000	
Peter Chan Jer Hing	2000–2001	
Niam Chiang Meng	2002–2005	
Lui Tuck Yew	2005–2006	
Tay Kim Poh	2006–2010	
Cheong Koon Hean	2010–2020	
Fong Chun Wah (acting)	2021	
Tan Meng Dui	2021–present	

== See also ==
- Public housing in Singapore
- New towns of Singapore
- Cash-Over-Valuation
- HLM (France)
