= Bintang Bakti Masyarakat =

Public service award in Singapore

Bintang Bakti Masyarakat (Public Service Star)
- Ribbon after 1996
- Type: Medal
- Awarded for: Valuable public service or distinguished performance
- Presented by: Singapore
- Eligibility: Any person
- Status: Active
- Established: 1963
- Ribbon prior to 1996

Precedence
- Next (higher): Pingat Jasa Gemilang
- Next (lower): Pingat Pentadbiran Awam, Emas

The Bintang Bakti Masyarakat (English: Public Service Star) is a Singaporean decoration instituted in 1963. It is awarded to any person who has rendered valuable public service to the people of Singapore, or who has distinguished themselves in the field of arts and letters, sports, the sciences, business, the professions and the labour movement. Bars may be issued for further service.

Recipients are entitled to use the post-nominal letters BBM.

The Bintang Bakti Masyarakat was first awarded in 1963. There were 88 recipients of the initial award which included community leaders, artists, social workers and trade union leaders.

== Description ==
- The medal consists of two concentric rings having, on the obverse side, a five-pointed star with star-burst design. In the centre is embossed a circular shield bearing a crescent and five stars. At the bottom half of the outer ring is a scroll bearing the inscription "BINTANG BAKTI MASYARAKAT". The inner ring is embossed with a laurel wreath.
- The reverse bears the State Arms.
- The ribbon is grey with a white centre stripe flanked immediately on each side by a red stripe, a thin white stripe, another red stripe and finally, a thin white stripe, in that order.

== See also ==
- Category: Recipients of the Bintang Bakti Masyarakat
