= Pingat Jasa Gemilang =

Singaporean national honour

Pingat Jasa Gemilang (Meritorious Service Medal)
- Type: Medal
- Established: 1962; 64 years ago
- Country: Singapore
- Awarded for: Service of conspicuous merit in Singapore, or in special circumstances elsewhere
- Status: Active
- Post-nominals: PJG

Precedence
- Next (higher): Pingat Gagah Perkasa
- Next (lower): Bintang Bakti Masyarakat
- Equivalent: Pingat Jasa Gemilang (Tentera)
- Ribbon after 1996 Ribbon prior to 1996

The Pingat Jasa Gemilang (English: Meritorious Service Medal) is a Singaporean national honour and medal instituted in 1962. It may be awarded to any person who has performed "service of conspicuous merit characterised by resource and devotion to duty, including long service marked by exceptional ability, merit and exemplary conduct within Singapore". It may also be awarded to any person outside of Singapore under exceptional circumstances.

Recipients are entitled to use the post-nominal letters PJG.

The Singapore Armed Forces equivalent of the award is the Pingat Jasa Gemilang (Tentera).

== History ==
The Pingat Jasa Gemilang was one of six state awards instituted on 19 April 1962. The rules of the award were revised in July 1996.

== Description ==
- The medal is silver-gilt having, on the obverse side, a rhomboid artifice superimposed upon a multi-perforated base. In the centre of the artifice is a shield bearing a crescent and 5 stars and below it a scroll with the inscription "PINGAT JASA GEMILANG".
- The reverse bears the State arms.
- The ribbon is grey with a red centre band flanked on each side by a white stripe and a thin red stripe.

== Award recipients ==
There have been more than 103 recipients of the Pingat Jasa Gemilang since 1998. Several notable recipients include:

Year	Recipient	Notes	Ref
1962	Tan Howe Liang	weightlifter	
1962	Stanley Toft Stewart	politician	
1967	John Le Cain	Commissioner of the Singapore Police Force	
1970	Cheng Tong Fatt	Diplomat	
1974	S. R. Nathan	politician	
1978	Ngiam Tong Dow	Civil servant	
1979	Tommy Koh	diplomat	
1984	Lee Ek Tieng	civil servant	
1990	Chor Yeok Eng	politician	
1992	Chen Wen Hsi	artist (posthumous)	
1996	Liu Kang	artist	
1998	Tee Tua Ba	High Commissioner in Bandar Seri Begawan, Brunei	
2003	Khoo Boon Hui	Commissioner of the Singapore Police Force	
2003	Tan Swie Hian	artist	
2005	Chan Heng Chee	diplomat	
2005	Mohideen MP Haja Rubin	retired Supreme Court Judge	
2006	Edwin Nadason Thumboo	poet and academic	
2006	Joscelin Yeo	swimmer	
2007	Lee Hsien Yang	former CEO of SingTel	
2007	Gerard Ee	Chairman of the National Kidney Foundation	
2008	Feng Tianwei	table tennis player	
2008	Wang Yuegu	table tennis player	
2008	Li Jiawei	table tennis player	
2010	Peter Ong	Head of Civil Service	
2012	Wong Ngit Liong	Chairman of National University of Singapore Board of Trustees	
2014	Lee Tzu Yang	Chairman of the Public Service Commission	
2015	Canagasabai Kunalan	athlete and educator	
2015	Hamdan Abu Bakar	Bruneian politician	
2016	Joseph Schooling	swimmer	
2016	Yip Pin Xiu	swimmer	
2017	Mohamad Fuzi Harun	Inspector-General of Police, Royal Malaysia Police	

== See also ==
- Category: Recipients of the Pingat Jasa Gemilang
- Category: Recipients of the Pingat Jasa Gemilang (Tentera)
