= Tan Chok Kian =

Singaporean civil servant (1931–2015)

Alphonsus Tan Chok Kian PPA(E) PPA(P)
- Tan in 1963

Chairman of the Central Provident Fund Board
- In office 12 October 1980 – 14 February 1986
- Preceded by: Han Cheng Fong
- Succeeded by: Lim Siong Guan

Personal details
- Born: 15 February 1931 Johor, Unfederated Malay States
- Died: 20 December 2015 (aged 84) Singapore
- Spouse: Antoinette Kwok Sai Eng (m. 1957)
- Children: 3
- Education: University of Malaya in Singapore (BA); St. Joseph's Institution

Chinese name
- Traditional Chinese: 陳祝強
- Simplified Chinese: 陈祝强
Transcriptions
Standard Mandarin
- Hanyu Pinyin: Chén Zhùqiáng
- IPA: [ʈʂʰə̌n.ʈʂû.tɕʰiǎŋ]

Alphonsus Tan Chok Kian (Note: Chinese: see Chinese name and romanisations) PPA(E) PPA(P) (15 February 1931 – 20 December 2015) was a Singaporean civil servant and the first chairman of Post Office Savings Bank from 1972 to 1986, after it became a statutory board of the Ministry of Communications.

Tan was permanent secretary for the Ministry of National Development (1970–1971), Ministry of Finance (1971–1975), Ministry of Social Affairs (1975–1977) and Ministry of Culture (1976–1977).

Tan also served as chairman of Acma Limited (1972–1989), (Note: Listed on the Singapore Exchange as AYV, previously known as Acma Electrical Industries Limited.) Central Provident Fund (1980–1986) and the Stock Exchange of Singapore (1986–1989). He was a director of SAL Industrial Leasing Limited, (Note: Formerly listed on the Stock Exchange of Singapore as SAL and a subsidiary of Singapore Technologies, now known as Vickers Capital Pte Ltd.) and the Development Bank of Singapore (1971–1981).

== Early life and education ==
On 15 February 1931, Alphonsus Tan Chok Kian was born in Johor, Malaysia, and had a total of 14 brothers and sisters. His father was a businessman who migrated from China, and died when Tan was nine years old.

Initially studying at a Chinese-medium primary school in Johor, Tan enrolled in St. Anthony's Boys' School in Singapore from Primary 2 onwards. After the Japanese occupation of Singapore ended, Tan continued to study at St. Anthony's and obtained a Senior Cambridge. Thereafter, Tan attended St. Joseph's Institution.

In 1955, Tan graduated from the University of Malaya in Singapore with a Bachelor of Arts in economics.

== Career ==
=== Early career ===
Upon graduation in 1955, Tan joined the Singapore Civil Service and he was posted to the Ministry of Health. A few months later, Tan was transferred to the Chief Secretary's Office, assisting William Goode. In 1957, Tan was transferred to the Ministry of Commerce and Industry. Less than a year later, Tan was transferred to the Ministry of Finance (MOF). Tan served as the principal assistant secretary in the ministry.

On 1 September 1961, his promotion was approved by Yusof Ishak. During a strike by more than 200 People's Association staff, Tan led a delegation to negotiate with the union representatives, discussing matters such as salary increment and better working conditions. In 1962, Tan succeeded A. G. B. Colton, the last expatriate in the treasury division of MOF, as deputy secretary.

In April 1965, while serving as a governor of Singapore Polytechnic, Tan was appointed to chair a committee into reorganising the registrar's office of Nanyang University, with the aim of making the office as efficient as other local institutions.

In 1970, Tan was appointed as permanent secretary for the Ministry of National Development. In September 1971, he was transferred back to MOF, serving as its permanent secretary. To make the city more lively, Tan together with principal planner, A. G. S. Danaraj, announced plans for more stores, hawker centres, parks and shopping centres. In August 1972, Tan was promoted to superscale grade C with four other permanent secretaries, (Note: Namely Tay Seow Huah, Kwa Soon Chuan, Ngiam Tong Dow and Cheng Tong Fatt.) earning S$2,350 per month.

=== Post Office Savings Bank (1972–1986) ===
On 1 January 1972, Tan was appointed as chairman of Post Office Savings Bank (POSB), the same day that the Post Office Savings Bank of Singapore Act came into effect, making the bank a statutory board of the Ministry of Communications. During the official opening of its headquarters along Middle Road in 1973, Tan hoped that the bank would provide better service to its customers and encourage more saving habits.

In 1975, Tan was transferred to the Ministry of Social Affairs. From 1976 to 1977, Tan was also concurrently permanent secretary for the Ministry of Culture, after its permanent secretary, Kwa Soon Chuan, retired. Thereafter, he was appointed as director general of Nanyang University. Tan announced plans to increase recruitment efforts for high calibre lecturers, aimed at making sure the quality of lecturers were on par with University of Singapore.

In January 1979, Tan announced a new subsidiary of the bank, named POSB Computer Services Pte. Ltd., aimed at increasing computerisation efforts. He also signed a purchase agreement with IBM for a S$4.5 million IBM 3031, to handle a huge increase in volume of transactions handled by the bank.

On 12 October 1980, Tan succeeded Han Cheng Fong as chairman of the Central Provident Fund (CPF).

In 1984, the 14th World Congress of Savings Banks was held in Singapore, making it the first time the congress was held in Asia. As the host country, Tan addressed more than 700 delegates from 40 countries in his opening speech.

On 16 February 1986, on his 55th birthday, Tan had to retire as chairman of CPF, and he was succeeded by Lim Siong Guan. The next day, after 14 years of service, Tan was replaced by Chua Kim Yeow as chairman of POSB.

=== Later career ===
In October 1986, Tan was the only Singaporean to serve as a director for the Asia–Pacific board of IBM. In November 1986, Tan was offered a contract by the Monetary Authority of Singapore to serve as the executive chairman of the Stock Exchange of Singapore for a three-year term. One of the first order of business was the establishment of a disciplinary subcommittee, aimed at investigating possible rule violations and act against listed companies. In December 1986, Tan also announced the acquisition of a S$500,000 HP 9000 800 series 840 system to detect insider trading, share rigging and other forms of market abuse. In April 1987, Tan announced another computer acquisition, a S$4 million IBM 3090 model 150, to cope with an increase in online transactions.

In June 1988, Tan was appointed as Singapore's trade representative to Taiwan, replacing William Cheng. In November 1989, Tan was succeeded by E. W. Barker as chairman of the stock exchange.

== Personal life ==
Tan was a Catholic.

On 5 January 1957, Tan married Antoinette Kwok Sai Eng at the Church of Saints Peter and Paul. They had a daughter and two sons.

Tan and his family lived in the Windsor Park estate, off Upper Thomson Road. Tan was an avid golf player, representing his ministry during inter-ministry competitions at the Singapore Island Country Club. In November 1974, Tan also represented Singapore in a golf match against Malaysian civil servants held in Kuala Lumpur.

After suffering from rheumatoid arthritis, Tan died on 20 December 2015. A memorial mass was held for him on 16 January 2016 at the Church of the Holy Spirit, Upper Thomson Road in Bishan.

== Awards and decorations ==
=== National awards ===
- Public Administration Medal (Gold), in 1980.
- Public Administration Medal (Silver), in 1963.

=== Foreign honours ===
- Officer Cross of Merit of the Sovereign Military Order of Malta, in 2024.
- Knight of Magistral Grace in Obedience
- Conventual Chaplain ad honorem, in 2003.
