= Pang Tee Pow =

Singaporean civil servant (1928–1977)

Pang Tee Pow DUBC PJG PPA(P)
- Pang in the 1970s

Chairman of the Housing and Development Board
- In office 1 February 1969 – 11 August 1970
- Preceded by: Howe Yoon Chong
- Succeeded by: Lee Hee Seng

Chairman of the Central Provident Fund Board
- In office 6 September 1966 – 1 September 1970
- Preceded by: K. M. Byrne
- Succeeded by: Lim Joo Hock

Personal details
- Born: 1928 Singapore, Straits Settlements
- Died: 15 November 1977 (aged 48–49) Singapore General Hospital, Singapore
- Cause of death: Lung cancer
- Resting place: Choa Chu Kang Cemetery
- Spouse: Moonlight Hing
- Children: 4
- Education: University of Malaya (BA); Raffles Institution

Chinese name
- Traditional Chinese: 馮世保
- Simplified Chinese: 冯世保
Transcriptions
Standard Mandarin
- Hanyu Pinyin: Féng Shìbǎo
- IPA: [fə̌ŋ.ʂɻ̩̂.pàʊ]

Pang Tee Pow DUBC PJG PPA(P) (c. 1928 – 15 November 1977) was a Singaporean civil servant and former chairman of the Housing and Development Board between 1969 and 1970. From 1966 to 1970, Pang was also the chairman of the Central Provident Fund Board.

== Early life and education ==
Pang Tee Pow attended Raffles Institution, and obtained a Senior Cambridge in 1949. He then joined the Singapore Civil Service as a laboratory assistant. In August 1950, Pang was promoted and became a labour inspector in the Labour Department.

On 26 January 1951, Pang was awarded a government scholarship to study at the University of Malaya. In October 1955, he graduated with a Bachelor of Arts in economics.

In September 1975, together with J. Y. Pillay, Pang attended the 13-week Advanced Management Program at Harvard University.

== Career ==
=== Early career ===
Upon graduation, Pang joined the administrative service in the Singapore Civil Service, serving as the assistant commissioner for labour. During his tenure, Pang represented Singapore at numerous International Labour Organisation conferences.

In September 1959, Pang was transferred from the Prime Minister's Office to the Ministry of Home Affairs to serve as an administrative officer. In October 1959, Pang was also appointed as a registrar of citizens and an assistant registrar of societies. In the next month, Pang requested 15 societies thought to have ceased operations to proof their existence.

In April 1960, Pang was appointed as acting deputy deputy controller of immigration. In October 1961, he was promoted to registrar of societies. On 26 December 1961, Pang succeeded Kok Ah Loy as commissioner for the Ministry of Labour. In January 1962, during a strike by the union of the Oversea-Chinese Banking Corporation, Pang invited both the bank management and the union representatives for talks to settle the dispute and end the strike. In February 1962, Pang was appointed by Chief Justice Alan Rose to be a commissioner of oaths.

In May 1963, Pang was appointed by Chief Justice Wee Chong Jin to chair a committee of inquiry to probe into the conversion of daily-rated government employees to a monthly-rated scale. A year later, in May 1964, the committee published an interim report, and recommended the government to implement a wage revision for daily-rated government employees as soon as possible.

=== Ministry of Labour (1966–1970) ===
In 1966, Pang was promoted to become permanent secretary for the Ministry of Labour. On 6 September 1966, Pang succeeded K. M. Byrne as chairman of the Central Provident Fund Board (CPF). On 1 February 1969, Pang replaced Howe Yoon Chong as chairman of the Housing and Development Board. In September 1969, Pang was also appointed as permanent secretary for the Home Affairs Division and Central Manpower Base of the Ministry of Interior and Defence.

=== Ministry of Defence (1970–1977) ===
On 11 August 1970, Pang was appointed as the permanent secretary for the Ministry of Defence. As such, he stepped down as chairman of HDB, however, there was no immediate successor. On 1 September 1970, Pang stepped down as chairman of CPF, and he was succeeded by Lim Joo Hock. In December 1970, Pang took over Hon Sui Sen as chairman of Sembawang Shipyard.

On 17 March 1974, during the opening of the Singapore Armed Forces Non-Commissioned Officers (SAF NCOs) Club on Beach Road, Pang explained that construction costed S$236,000, and he hoped that the club will be self-financing through the support of SAF NCOs.

== Personal life ==
Pang was married to Moonlight Hing, and they had three daughters and a son. He was also an avid golf player, and he often played at the Singapore Island Country Club. In May 1975, Pang lead the Singapore team at golf against Malaysia during the annual civil service tournament.

On 29 July 1977, Pang was admitted to the intensive care unit of the Singapore General Hospital after suffering a myocardial infarction. Dr Kwa Soon Bee, the hospital's superintendent of nursing and brother of Kwa Geok Choo, said Pang's condition was "satisfactory".

On 15 November, Pang died from lung cancer in Singapore General Hospital. A funeral was held at his residence located at 24A Berrima Road, and he was later buried in Choa Chu Kang Cemetery. Minister for Defence Goh Keng Swee, alongside many high-ranking military officers, attended his funeral. In a condolence letter addressed to his wife, Prime Minister Lee Kuan Yew wrote:

I cannot find words equal to my sorrow at the death of Pang Tee Pow.
The day after a meeting on 28 July in the Cabinet Office, I heard he was taken ill. A few days later, I was told it was cancer of the lung. I found it painful to see him decline so rapidly on the several occasions I visited him. It must have been a harrowing experience for your children and you.
I first knew him some 15 years ago. He was my secretary. He was dependable and unflappable. The last 7 years he spent in the Ministry of Defence. His competence, hard work and judgement, stemming from long experience handling men, these qualities made him a pillar of strength in Mindef. He never evaded his responsibilities nor shirked unpleasant decisions — qualities essential for the management of a large disciplined force.
We shall all miss him. I understand how grievous your loss is for I feel the gap that has been left in the top ranks. This gap is not easy to fill. My deepest sympathies to you and your children.

== Awards and decorations ==
- Distinguished Service Order, posthumously awarded in 1978.
- Meritorious Service Medal, in 1970.
- Public Administration Medal (Silver), in 1963.
