= Moh Siew Meng =

Singaporean civil servant (1947 – 1995)

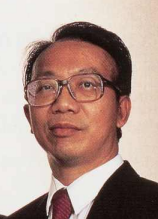

Chief Executive Officer of the Housing and Development Board
- In office 1 November 1991 – 1 April 1995
- Preceded by: Lim Hng Kiang
- Succeeded by: Tan Guong Ching

Permanent secretary of the Ministry of Labour
- In office 1 September 1984 – 31 October 1991
- Preceded by: Han Cheng Fong
- Succeeded by: Chuang Kwong Yong

Personal details
- Born: 1947
- Died: 26 October 1995 (aged 48)

John Moh Siew Meng (1947 – 26 October 1995) was a Singaporean civil servant. Initially an official with the Ministry of Finance and the Ministry of National Development, he was transferred to the Ministry of Trade and Industry, becoming a senior official there by the late 1970s. He then served as the permanent secretary in the Ministry of Labour from 1984 to 1991 and the Chief Executive Officer (CEO) of the Housing and Development Board (HDB) from 1991 to 1995.

== Early life and education ==
Moh was born in 1947. In the early 1960s, he was a student at Raffles Institution. He was a government scholar. He graduated from the University of Singapore with a Diploma in Business Administration in 1974.

== Career ==
=== Ministry of Finance and Temasek Holdings ===
Moh entered the Administrative Service around 1970, and became an official at the Ministry of Finance by 1974. According to researcher Juergen Braunstein, he was one of six "high-level" civil servants, several of whom were with the Ministry of Finance, appointed the founding directors of Temasek Holdings investment firm in that year to "build the core element of Temasek governance." Braunstein characterised these appointments as the Singaporean government's attempt to "exert control over the controlled companies or subholdings." Moh was the deputy director of the ministry's Revenue Division in 1977. He was also an official with the Ministry of National Development, in this period.

=== Ministry of Trade and Industry ===
Moh had become the divisional director of the Ministry of Trade and Industry (MTI) by July 1979. He was also a general manager at the Singapore National Oil Corporation (SNOC) by February 1981. In that month, the ministry appointed him a director of the newly founded Fullerton Alpha Shipping alongside Chua Yong Hai, the general manager of Temasek Holdings. The firm was the second shipping company to be established by the Singapore government after Neptune Orient Lines. In April, he accompanied the Minister for Trade and Industry Goh Chok Tong on a seven-day official visit to Kuwait and Oman. The following month, he returned to Kuwait as a member of a seven-man economic delegation, led by Ngiam Tong Dow, sent by the SNOC to "discuss details of an arrangement" to buy oil from its equivalent there. Also in 1981, he chaired the editorial committee of the Economic Survey of Singapore of 1980. He served as a member of the National Statistics Commission, the Sentosa Development Corporation and the Singapore Tourist Promotion Board in this period.

In January 1982, Moh was appointed the Director of Economics for Trade and Industry, succeeding Ng Kiat Chong, who had been transferred to the Ministry of Labour as the secretary of the National Productivity Council. This put him in charge of "economic planning, manpower planning, trade, research and development and tourism." He again chaired the editorial committee of the Economic Survey of Singapore for its 1982 report. In March 1984, Moh was appointed to the Economic Development Board. He remained on the board for nearly eight years before resigning on 31 January 1992.

=== Ministry of Labour ===
On 1 September 1984, Moh was appointed the permanent secretary of the Ministry of Labour, succeeding Han Cheng Fong, who had been reassigned to be the deputy managing director at the Petrochemical Corporation of Singapore. The government gazette reported that this appointment had been made by President Devan Nair on the advice of Goh Chok Tong, who was now the Prime Minister. In February 1985, the now-obsolete Fullerton Alpha Shipping and Fullerton Beta Shipping were wound up, having "stopped functioning for some time." Moh remained with the SNOC as general manager, and in this period had a prominent role within a team which was "spearheading" negotiations with Petronas, the national oil company of Malaysia, for the supply of natural gas to Singapore.

Moh served as the Ministry of Labour's representative on the National Wages Council (NWC). In April 1986, he was appointed the head of a newly-established 10-man NWC subcommittee which was to develop proposals for wage reform. The subcommittee aimed to design a system which "links wages to workers' productivity and the profits of their companies." Other priorities of the group included addressing the various "shortcomings" of the country's wage system. The subcommittee recommended the formation of and was succeeded by a task force in January, chaired still by Moh. This group was to look into implementing the NWC's proposals regarding a flexible wage system in the public sector. The proposals had already "received the nod" in the private sector, and the task force's existence was necessitated by the "size and numerous salary scales and occupational groups" of the public sector. The new system was adopted by the public sector from 1 July of the following year.

In April 1988, he was appointed to the Advisory Council on the Aged, led by Minister for Home Affairs and Second Minister for Law S. Jayakumar. He was named the Ministry of Labour's representative on the Economic Policy Review Committee, led by Minister of State for Trade and Industry Mah Bow Tan, which was formed in 1989 to examine the economic impact of government policies. He was a director of the firm Singapore Shipbuilding and Engineering by 1990. He remained with the company until his resignation in May 1992. On 1 April 1991, he was promoted to a Superscale C salary.

=== Housing and Development Board ===
On 16 August 1991, HDB CEO Lim Hng Kiang, who had only assumed the position on 1 January, resigned as a civil servant to run in the upcoming general election. Moh was "tipped" to succeed Lim as CEO in October and officially assumed the role on 1 November after two weeks of briefings on the operations of the board. He was succeeded as permanent secretary by Chuang Kwong Yong, the HDB CEO immediately prior to Lim. On taking office, he announced that the board would "need to enhance the way it delivers its services to the public", noting that changes in policy and procedure would need to be "well" communicated to the masses to be fully effective. Moh was conferred the Public Administration Medal (Gold) at the 1994 National Day Awards for his "administrative guidance and leadership" which was "instrumental in motivating HDB's staff to give of [sic] their best." On receiving the medal, he proclaimed that his successes throughout his time with the Ministry of Labour and the HDB were the product of a "collective effort".

On 27 March 1995, it was announced that Moh would be resigning as CEO as he was to begin undergoing chemotherapy. He was assigned "light duties" in the meantime, being transferred to the Public Service Division of the Prime Minister's Office (PMO). He was put in charge of managing the Administrative Service alongside Lim Siong Guan, the permanent secretary in the PMO, and to serve as a 'resource person' for the Civil Service College. Additionally, he remained a member of the HDB and continued as a director of the SNOC and as the deputy chairman of EM Services, a joint venture of the HDB and Keppel Land. He was succeeded as CEO by Tan Guong Ching, previously the permanent secretary in the Ministry of the Environment, on 1 April. Hsuan Owyang, who had chaired the HDB throughout Moh's tenure, described Moh in his 1998 autobiography as a "very dedicated and conscientious civil servant".

== Personal life and death ==
Moh was married and had three children. As of 1990, the family resided at 42 Tudor Close. He died of cancer on 26 October 1995, aged 48, at the Singapore General Hospital.
