= Yong Ying-I =

Singaporean economist and civil servant

Yong Ying-I PPA(E) PPA(P) PBS

Chairman of the Central Provident Fund Board
- Incumbent
- Assumed office 1 July 2021
- Preceded by: Chiang Chie Foo

Personal details
- Born: 1964 (age 61–62) Kuala Lumpur, Malaysia
- Education: Harvard Business School (MBA); University of Cambridge (BA)

Chinese name
- Traditional Chinese: 楊穎儀
- Simplified Chinese: 杨颖仪
Transcriptions
Standard Mandarin
- Hanyu Pinyin: Yáng Yǐngyí
- IPA: [jǎŋ.ìŋ.ǐ]

Yong Ying-I (Note: Chinese: see Chinese name and romanisations) PPA(E) PPA(P) PBS (born c. 1964) is a Singaporean economist and civil servant.

She was also the second female permanent secretary in Singapore, serving in the Ministry of Manpower (2002–2005), Ministry of Health (2005–2012), National Research Foundation (2011–2019), Public Service Division (2012–2019) and Ministry of Communications and Information (2019–2022).

Yong served as chairman of the Infocomm and Development Agency (2007–2015), Civil Service College (2011–2015). She also served as a director of Sembcorp (2003–2010) and Singtel (2022–present).

Yong is the incumbent chairman of the Central Provident Fund.

== Early life and education ==
In 1964, Yong Ying-I was born in Kuala Lumpur, and she was the only child. Her father, Yong Pung How, was an advocate, solicitor and later Chief Justice of Singapore. In the late 1960s, as the medium of instruction in Malaysian schools were switching to Malay, Yong's parents were disinclined for her to study in Malaysia. As such, her family migrated to Singapore in 1969. Yong attended Hwa Chong Junior College.

In June 1985, under an overseas scholarship awarded by the Public Service Commission, Yong sat for a tripos and graduated from the University of Cambridge with first class honours, obtaining a Bachelor of Arts in economics. In 1990, Yong graduated from Harvard Business School with a Master of Business Administration.

== Career ==
Upon graduation, Yong returned to Singapore and began her career in the Ministry of Trade and Industry (MTI), eventually rising to the position of assistant director. In 1992, an article was published in the Far Eastern Economic Review, reporting about comments made by Senior Minister Lee Kuan Yew regarding Singapore's economic growth. The ministry claimed that the article misreported Lee, and in response to the article, Yong clarified that the economic growth in Singapore is not reliant on a "frenetic stock exchange" as major foreign and multinational companies are not listed on the Stock Exchange of Singapore.

In 1993, Yong was promoted to director in MTI. In 1995, at the age of 31, Yong was the youngest officer to reach superscale G grade in the administrative division of the Singapore Civil Service. In an interview to The Straits Times, Yong elaborated:

I thought I had a good chance. I do think a certain part of it was due to the changes in personnel management as well — I'm lucky, because I was in the right place at the right time, at the right age!
I think the key factor was that I had been doing a superscale job in MTI. I owe that appointment to my Permanent Secretary at MTI Lam Chuan Leong who took the risk and entrusted the directorship to me at a time when I was still an assistant secretary. At 29, I must have been the most junior director in the whole of government!

In 1997, Yong was transferred to become a principal private secretary for Deputy Prime Minister Lee Hsien Loong. In 1999, Yong was appointed as chief executive officer of the IT and Telecommunications Authority, a newly-established statutory board under the Ministry of Communications. The statutory board was later renamed as the Infocomm Development Authority (IDA). Upon the establishment, Yong announced plans promote the growth and development of infocommunications in Singapore, and reassured industry stakeholders that there will be liberalisation and support provided. Yong also said the board's aim was to transform Singapore into the "largest information and communications hub" within Asia. In 2000, Yong urged for local companies to regionalise and globalise through e-commerce, and hoped that Singapore will become the target for the Asian market. She stepped down as chief executive in 2001.

On 1 January 2002, Yong was the second woman to be appointed as permanent secretary for the Ministry of Manpower (MOM), replacing Tan Chin Nam. Shortly after, on 9 January, Yong was also appointed to the Economic Review Committee, chaired by Minister of State Ng Eng Hen. In September 2003, Yong was the founding chairman of the Workforce Development Agency (WDA), a newly-established statutory board under MOM to promote continuing education and professional training for workers. In her first press conference, Yong pledged that the agency will tackle the immediate problem of unemployment, aiming to assist more than 85,100 unemployed workers within a year.

On 1 July 2005, Yong was transferred to the Ministry of Health, serving as its permanent secretary. On 15 February 2006, Yong officially launched the first postgraduate school for allied healthcare workers in Singapore, established by the Singapore General Hospital. In January 2007, to foster closer cooperation in healthcare, Yong signed a memorandum of understanding with her Dubai counterpart, Qadhi Saeed Almurooshid. In February 2007, Yong also announced plans to set up standards for healthcare IT infrastructure nationwide, ensuring patient data to be standardised and easily shared between all public and private healthcare providers.

On 31 August 2007, Yong stepped down as chairman of WDA. She was succeeded by her deputy chairman, Tan Pheng Hock. In December 2007, Yong was appointed as chairman of IDA, replacing Lam Chuan Leong.

In November 2011, Yong was appointed as permanent secretary for national research and development, while maintaining her existing portfolio. On 1 April 2012, Yong relinquished her health portfolio and succeeded Lim Soo Hoon as permanent secretary for the public service division.

On 30 November 2015, Yong stepped down as chairman of IDA, with Chan Yeng Kit as her successor.

On 1 April 2019, Yong became permanent secretary for the Ministry of Communications and Information. On 1 July 2021, Yong was appointed as chairman of the Central Provident Fund, succeeding Chiang Chie Foo. On 1 April 2022, after 36 years in the public service, Yong retired, relinquishing her permanent secretary role for MCI to Joseph Leong.

== Awards and decorations ==
- Long Service Medal, in 2012.
- Public Administration Medal (Gold), in 2005.
- Public Administration Medal (Silver), in 1997.
