= Han Cheng Fong =

Singaporean businessman (born 1942)

Han Cheng Fong PPA(E) PPA(P)

Chairman of the Central Provident Fund Board
- In office 1 February 1979 – 12 October 1980
- Preceded by: William Cheng
- Succeeded by: Tan Chok Kian

Personal details
- Born: February 1942 (age 84)
- Education: University of Birmingham (PhD, MSc); University of Singapore (BSc); Victoria School

Chinese name
- Traditional Chinese: 韓禎豐
- Simplified Chinese: 韩祯丰
Transcriptions
Standard Mandarin
- Hanyu Pinyin: Hán Zhēnfēng
- IPA: [xǎn.ʈʂə́n.fə́ŋ]

Han Cheng Fong (Note: Chinese: see Chinese name and romanisations) (born February 1942) is a real estate developer, businessman and former Singaporean civil servant. Han was known as the youngest chairman of the Central Provident Fund, where he served from 1979 to 1980. Han also served as chairman of Raffles Holdings, Scotts Holdings, and the Times Publishing Group. He was as director of Sembawang Shipyard (1977 to 1985), (Note: Part of SembCorp Marine, listed on the Singapore Exchange as S51.) the Singapore Land Transport Authority (1995 to 1997), and the healthcare business, Parkway Pantai (1997 to 2000).

== Early life and education ==
On 2 February 1942, Han Cheng Fong was born in a Hainanese family. He had four brothers and two sisters. Han received his early education at Victoria School. In January 1965, under a State Scholarship, Han graduated from the University of Singapore, obtaining a Bachelor of Science in physics. In September 1966, Han was awarded a Commonwealth Scholarship to study at the University of Birmingham. Han graduated in 1969 with a Master of Science and Doctor of Philosophy in theoretical physics. In March 1973, Han obtained a diploma in business administration from the University of Singapore.

== Public service career ==
In 1970, Han joined the Singapore Civil Service, and worked in the Ministry of Science and Technology, serving as its deputy secretary. In 1977, Han served as director of administration and management services in the Ministry of Education. In 1978, Han announced that the ministry will release an instruction manual for principals on the policies and procedures needed to run a school.

On 1 June 1978, Han took over William Cheng as permanent secretary for the Ministry of Labour. In January 1979, Han led a team of nine to visit various companies island wide, conducting in-depth discussions on issues faced by the companies and how the ministry can reshaping labour policies to help them.

On 1 February 1979, at the age of 37, Han was the youngest to be appointed as chairman of the Central Provident Fund. On 12 October 1980, Han was succeeded by Tan Chok Kian.

As Han had a personal desire to move to the private sector, he retired from his permanent secretary position on 1 September 1984, and was succeeded by Moh Siew Meng.

== Private service career ==
Upon leaving the civil service, Han joined the Petrochemical Corporation of Singapore (PCS), serving as its deputy managing director. On 1 July 1987, Han was appointed as chairman of Sembawang Projects Engineering, a newly-formed subsidiary of Sembcorp, which focussed on Sembcorp's on-shore businesses.

On 1 July 1989, Han left PCS and joined DBS Land (now merged into CapitaLand) as its managing director. During his tenure, Han signed numerous agreements with other companies to develop real estate, such as with Tropical Resorts to develop Laguna Golf Bintan located on Bintan Island, and with Straits Steamship Land (now merged into KeppelLand) to develop a S$360 million 28-storey office building at 20 Cecil Street.

In 1996, Han was appointed as group chief executive officer of DBS Land and chairman of Raffles Holdings. In March 1999, he was appointed as chairman of Scotts Holdings. On 18 April 2000, Han left DBS Land. Later in April and May, Han also resigned as chairman of Raffles and Scotts.

In a shocking move, Han joined rival Centrepoint Properties (CP) in November 2000, expanding the group's portfolio in Australia. Shortly after, in May 2001, Han was appointed as chief executive officer of CP. In March 2002, Han stepped down as CEO and became managing director of parent company Fraser and Neave (F&N). In 2006, Han succeeded Michael Fam as CEO of F&N, and was appointed as chairman of the Times Publishing Group. However, in October 2007, citing differences in opinion with the board of directors, Han resigned from F&N. In addition to his salary of S$3.8 million, Han was also given a parting gift of S$5.05 million.

In November 2007, Han was appointed as chief executive officer of Far East International, the China division of the Sino Group. After his contract ended, Han jointly owned Brilliance International Development, a real estate development company, with a Chinese developer based in Hong Kong. In 2011, Han announced a S$278 million mixed-commercial development in Qingyang, Chengdu. In 2012, Han announced the launch of another mixed-use development in Yinchuan, Ningxia. In 2017, Han said he recouped his costs and made profits, after selling most of the units in the developments. As such, Han announced he will retire as a real estate developer.

== Personal life ==
Han is married to Tan Seng Too. His family lives in the Windsor Park estate, off Upper Thomson Road.

Han is an avid golf player, and took part in tournaments organised by Lianhe Zaobao and The Business Times throughout his career.

During his tenure at Fraser and Neave, Han enjoyed discounts to purchase real estate developments by the company. This included a S$1.6 million unit in Sentosa Cove, bought in 2005 with a 1.5% discount, and a S$758,190 condominium unit in Clementi, bought in 2007 with a 3.5% discount.
