= Robert Iau =

Singaporean civil servant (1935–2005)

Robert Iau PBM
- Iau in the 1990s

Personal details
- Born: 22 January 1935 British Singapore
- Died: 26 February 2005 (aged 70) Singapore
- Spouse(s): Margaret Lee (m. 1962, div. ?); Lee Seow Pong (m. 1978, div. 1990); Yap Choo Lian (m. 1992)
- Children: 2
- Education: University of Malaya in Singapore (BA)

Military service
- Allegiance: Singapore
- Branch/service: Republic of Singapore Air Force
- Rank: Colonel

Chinese name
- Traditional Chinese: 姚國光
- Simplified Chinese: 姚国光
Transcriptions
Standard Mandarin
- Hanyu Pinyin: Yáo Guóguāng
- IPA: [jǎʊ.kwǒ.kuáŋ]

Robert Iau Kuo Kwong PBM (22 January 1935 – 26 February 2005) was a Singaporean civil servant and an arts patron. He was the first administrative officer and later general manager of the Central Provident Fund Board, where he installed the board's first IBM 1401 in 1963.

Later, Iau was involved in establishing the National Computer Board and the Institute of Systems Science. He was chairman of the Singapore Arts Centre, which oversaw the development of Esplanade. Iau was also a director of the Post Office Savings Bank and Singapore Bus Services.

== Early life and education ==
On 22 January 1935, Robert Iau Kuo Kwong was born in Siang Lim Park, British Singapore. His father, Iau Tsang Kya (c. 1901–22 September 1982), was born in Shanghai, attended the University of Hong Kong, and became an engineer. His mother, Grace Bi-ru Iau (née Liu; c. 1903–26 April 1999), was born in Chongqing, attended Jinling Women's College, and became a teacher. Iau was a middle child and had two sisters. In 1937, his family moved to Jalan Masjid, located along Changi Road.

In 1939, Iau received his early education at Jing Fang Girls' School, where his mother taught. During the Bombing of Singapore, the school was bombed. After the Japanese occupation of Singapore, Iau attended the Anglo-Chinese School. In 1952, he obtained an A-level and went on to complete a Post School Certificate.

Iau joined the Singapore Wing, Malayan Auxiliary Air Force (MAAF), and began pilot training on the biplane de Havilland Tiger Moth. Later, he became a volunteer pilot, and participated in exercises with other squadrons of the MAAF. He obtained the rank of colonel.

In 1954, Iau attended the University of Malaya in Singapore, and he was part of the music society as a pianist. He was also active in theatre. In 1959, Iau graduated a Bachelor of Arts with honours in economics.

In 1979, Iau attended an advance management programme at Harvard Business School.

== Career ==
=== Civil career ===
Upon graduation, Iau joined Mansfield and Company Limited, and worked on cargo ships of the Blue Funnel Line between United Kingdom and Singapore. On 17 October 1959, he quit Mansfield and joined the Central Provident Fund Board (CPF), as the board's first administrative officer. Iau began working as a counter clerk, and in 1960, he was put in charge of planning and designing computer systems for CPF. In 1962, Iau was sent to Sydney by CPF, to learn how to write programs for an IBM 1401. In September 1963, he programmed and installed the first IBM computer system in Singapore.

In 1966, Iau was promoted to deputy general manager of CPF. In September 1967, he was transferred to the Ministry of Defence to set up a department in charge of data processing. In 1968, Iau was appointed as a director of the manpower division of MINDEF. During his tenure, he was involved with establishing the Singapore Armed Forces Overseas Scholarship scheme.

In 1971, Iau returned to CPF, and began working on a plan to upgrade its computer systems, as CPF was still using the same IBM 1401 that was introduced by Iau. In 1972, Iau was elected as president of the Singapore Computer Society (SCS). In 1973, he was promoted to general manager of CPF, and he installed an IBM System/370 Model 135.

In 1976, Iau was appointed as secretary general of the South East Asia Regional Computer Confederation (SEARCC). In March 1978, he was appointed as a governing council member of the Singapore Institute of Management. In August 1978, Iau said that there is a good likelihood of Singapore becoming a "centre for computer expertise", which can be done with more focus on training professionals in the field.

In July 1980, Iau announced plans to conduct microcomputer courses, and hoped that the course attendees could establish computer clubs in community centres, to introduce computers to residents living in the vicinity. On 23 July 1980, during a conference presentation, Iau said that Singapore was prepared for economic restructuring, as the technology was available to increase productivity.

=== Later career ===
In August 1980, Iau resigned from CPF, and on 1 November 1980, he joined Singapore Land as its managing director.

In 1981, at the request of the government, Iau was involved in establishing the National Computer Board and the Institute of Systems Science (ISS), and chaired a committee to introduce computer education in Ngee Ann Technical College. He also wrote a paper to the Ministry of Culture, which suggested establishing a performing arts centre and an arts council.

On 1 April 1982, Iau was appointed as a board member of the National Theatre Trust (NTT), which owned and operated the National Theatre. During a visit to the theatre, Iau asked the management committee whether the cantilever roof was structurally safe, and if there were regular inspections carried out. Eventually, the theatre was labelled structurally unsafe due to defects discovered, and it was demolished.

On 10 September 1983, as chairman of ISS, Iau advised graduates to practice lifelong learning to work in the computer industry. On 24 August 1984, Iau left Singapore Land to be managing director of Coopers & Lybrand Associates South-east Asia.

In September 1986, Iau was the first ASEAN national to be elected as a trustee of the International Federation of Information Processing. In October 1986, he led a task force, under the Small Enterprise Bureau, to study the role of small and medium enterprises in the future of Singapore, and the study of the current support scheme for these enterprises.

In March 1987, Iau was appointed as part of a three-man commission of inquiry to investigate the alleged corruption of Teh Cheang Wan. The inquiry ended due to lack of evidence. In September 1987, Iau was appointed as chairman of the Singapore branch of Memorex.

In 1988, Iau was appointed as chairman of the Committee on the Performing Arts. He said that a master plan should be created to develop performing arts in Singapore. He was also appointed as chairman of NTT.

In 1991, the National Arts Council was established, and Iau was appointed as a board member. In 1994, he was appointed chairman of the Singapore Arts Centre, which oversaw the development of Esplanade. He said that the development was "overwhelming but what a bloody challenge", and wanted Esplanade "to have something for everybody". He stepped down in 1998.

In 2001, Iau stepped down as secretary general of SEARCC.

== Personal life ==
Iau played the piano and received a ABRSM Grade 8 in 1951.

On 22 December 1962, Iau married Margaret Lee, and they had two sons, They were later divorced. On 1 December 1978, Iau married Lee Seow Pong (also known as Lee Siew Fong Ida). On 18 August 1989, Lee filed for divorce, citing adultery as the reason. The court pronounced decree nisi to dissolve the marriage. On 18 June 1992, he married Yap Choo Lian.

On 26 February 2005, he died of a myocardial infarction.

== Awards and decorations ==
- Public Service Medal, in 1988, for his contributions to the arts.
