= H. F. G. Leembruggen =

Singaporean civil servant (1925–1995)

Harold Francis Geoffrey Leembruggen JMN
- Leembruggen in 1968

Personal details
- Born: 20 May 1925 Ipoh, Perak, Federated Malay States
- Died: 9 November 1995 (aged 70) London, United Kingdom
- Spouse: Jean Grace Koch (m. 1952)
- Children: 2
- Education: University of Malaya in Singapore (BA); Victoria Institution
- Nickname(s): Jeffrey; Geoff

Harold Francis Geoffrey Leembruggen JMN (20 May 1925 – 9 November 1995) was a Singaporean civil servant and diplomat. Leembruggen held various top positions in the Ministry of Education, Ministry of Finance, and Ministry of Health, till his resignation in 1967.

== Early life and education ==
On 20 May 1925, Harold Francis Geoffrey Leembruggen was born in Ipoh, Perak, Federated Malay States. His father, James Francis Koch Leembruggen MBE, worked in the Electricity Department as a technical assistant. Leembruggen was the eldest, and he had a brother and a sister.

Leembruggen received his early education at the Victoria Institution. When the Japanese occupation of Malaya occurred, his family moved from Kuala Lumpur to Singapore. However, when the Japanese occupied Singapore, all Malayans had to return, and his family moved back to Kuala Lumpur. In 1946, after the war ended, he graduated with a Senior Cambridge, and he was awarded a Malayan Union Scholarship to study at the Raffles College.

Later on, the college was merged with the King Edward VII College of Medicine to form University of Malaya. Leembruggen was the first president of the newly-formed students' union. In July 1951, Leembruggen graduated from the University of Malaya in Singapore with a Bachelor of Arts (honours) in english language.

== Career ==
Upon graduation in 1951, Leembruggen joined the administrative service division of the Singapore Civil Service, working in the land office. Soon after, in September 1952, he was sent to an administrative officers' course in the United Kingdom, named the Devonshire course, held at the Trinity College, University of Cambridge. Leembruggen and his wife sailed on SS Corfu. A year later, Leembruggen returned to Singapore, and he was posted to the Internal Security Department as the third assistant secretary.

In September 1953, Leembruggen was selected to serve in the foreign service, and he left Singapore again to attend a course at the London School of Economics and Political Science. In September 1955, after completing the course, Leembruggen was seconded to the Malayan Civil Service. On 26 January 1957, he was sent to Sydney, to join its high commissioner's office as the first assistant commissioner of Malaya to Australia.

Shortly after Malaya gained independence on 31 August 1957, Leembruggen was recalled to Singapore and joined the Ministry of Education (MOE) to review its schemes of service. In September 1959, he was transferred to the Ministry of Finance (MOF) to be its assistant secretary. In January 1960, Leembruggen was promoted and transferred to the Ministry of Health (MOH), serving as its deputy permanent secretary and deputy director of medical services. In June 1961, Leembruggen resigned from his positions at MOH, and returned to MOE as its deputy secretary.

From 1962 to 1963, Leembruggen served as a deputy secretary in the Prime Minister's Office. In 1963, he was transferred to MOF as acting permanent secretary.

In January 1967, Leembruggen replaced Kwa Soon Chuan as the registrar of vehicles. On 13 June 1967, he resigned from the civil service to accept a position at the Malaysian Industrial Development Finance Berhad (MIDF) in Kuala Lumpur. Leembruggen said that he resigned as he believes he has "better prospects in the private sector".

In September 1968, Leembruggen was the first Malaysian to be appointed as general manager of MIDF.

== Personal life ==
In 1948, during a badminton match in Seremban, Leembruggen met Jean Grace Koch (born c. October 1932), who was from Malacca, Straits Settlements, and they began dating. Koch and Leembruggen were second cousins, as both their fathers were cousins. Koch was a nurse, and planned to migrate to New Zealand to further her career by assisting in cardiothoracic surgeries.

Koch's father, Mervyn Vere Koch AMN, worked in the Central Electricity Board in Malacca as a technical assistant, and her mother, Norma Grace Classen, volunteered with the social welfare department. Classen was also appointed a Justice of the Peace on 6 June 1953, and stood for the 1958 Malayan local elections in Tranquerah, Malacca.

In April 1952, Leembruggen married Koch, and held their wedding at the Bethesda Chapel, located on Bras Basah Road. As such, Koch gave up her nursing career to focus on motherhood. Together, they had a son and a daughter. His son was born in the Addenbrooke's Hospital, while Leembruggen was undergoing the Devonshire course.

In 1960, Koch became the first Asian Comptroller of Household, serving Yang di-Pertuan Negara Yusof Ishak and First Lady Puan Noor Aishah in the Istana.

On 9 November 1995, Leembruggen died in London, United Kingdom. On 21 November 1995, his funeral service was held at Wesley Methodist Church, Kuala Lumpur.

== Award ==
- Companion of the Order of the Defender of the Realm
