= Lim Joo Hock =

Singaporean civil servant and barrister (1922–2011)

- Lim in 1964

Chairman of the Central Provident Fund Board
- In office 1 October 1961 – December 1963
- Preceded by: James Puthucheary
- Succeeded by: K. M. Byrne
- In office 2 September 1970 – 31 January 1971
- Preceded by: Pang Tee Pow
- Succeeded by: Kwa Soon Chuan

Personal details
- Born: 15 January 1922 Selangor, Federated Malay States
- Died: May 2011 (aged 89) Singapore
- Citizenship: Singapore
- Spouse: Yap Kim Kiaw (m. c. 1940)
- Children: 3
- Education: University of London (LLB); University of Malaya in Singapore (BA); Raffles College; Tuanku Muhammad School

Chinese name
- Traditional Chinese: 林猷鶴
- Simplified Chinese: 林猷鹤
Transcriptions
Standard Mandarin
- Hanyu Pinyin: Lín Yóuhè
- IPA: [lǐn.jɔǔ.xɤ̂]

Lim Joo Hock (15 January 1922 – May 2011) was a Singaporean civil servant and former chairman of the Central Provident Fund Board from 1961 to 1963, and from 1970 to 1971.

Lim was the permanent secretary for the Ministry of Culture and Social Affairs (1967–1968), Ministry of Social Affairs (1968–1969), and Ministry of Labour (1969–1971). After leaving the civil service, Lim qualified as a barrister and started his own law firm, before retiring in 1998.

== Early life and education ==
On 15 January 1922, Lim Joo Hock was born in Selangor, the second-oldest among his brother and two sisters. His father, Lim Hong Chin, migrated from Hainan to British Malaya during the late 19th century, and worked as an assistant cook on Pulau Blakang Mati. After saving enough money, his father went to a few locations, such as Malacca and Pahang, to purchase rubber estates. Eventually, his father decided to settle down and took over ownership of a coffeeshop in Johol, Negeri Sembilan.

As there were no schools in Johor, Lim received his early education in Tampin at Government English School, Tampin. Thereafter, Lim went to Tuanku Muhammad School in Kuala Pilah. In 1938, he obtained a School Certificate and wanted to study medicine at King Edward VII College of Medicine. However, due to not taking certain subjects such as biology, Lim was unable to pursue medicine. Lim then enrolled at Malacca High School to take the required subjects, and sat for the School Certificate again.

In June 1939, Lim enrolled at Raffles College to pursue a diploma in arts. In 1941, Lim was one of the two recipients of the college's scholarship, with the other recipient being E. W. Barker. During the Pacific War, Lim's studies were disrupted, and he was recruited as a stretcher bearer in the Medical Auxiliary Service (MAS). Before the fall of Singapore, MAS was disbanded and Lim went back to Negeri Sembilan.

In November 1945, after the Japanese occupation of Malaya ended, Lim applied to work as a school teacher at his alma mater in Kuala Pilah, and he worked until December 1948. In 1947, Lim obtained a School Certificate credit in Chinese language, to qualify for matriculation into the law programme of the University of London.

In January 1951, Lim was awarded a scholarship to study a Bachelor of Arts at the University of Malaya in Singapore. In June 1952, he graduated with an honours degree in history.

In 1956, Lim obtained a Bachelor of Laws from the University of London. In 1973, Lim went back to England to become a barrister. In July 1974, he was called to the bar at Lincoln's Inn. On 13 August 1975, Lim was called to the Law Society of Singapore.

== Career ==
=== Early career ===
In June 1949, Lim was appointed as an assistant immigration officer by Sir Franklin Gimson, Governor of Singapore. Upon graduating with a degree, Lim was posted back to the immigration department, and he was the assistant controller until October 1957. After completing a 5 month course on public administration and public service in Australia, Lim was appointed as the acting controller of immigration department—the first Asian to take charge of the department.

In November 1957, the Singapore Council of Women wanted passports of married men to indicate their marriage status, in a bid to prevent them from bringing new wives in Singapore. In response, Lim said:

There is nothing on a man's passport to indicate whether he is married. I don't know of any country which uses a 'married' chop on a man's passport. It is against our policy to allow secondary wives to arrive if there is a primary wife already in Singapore. If the first wife wants to protect herself and does not object to her husband marrying again, whether here or overseas, then she must prove that her own marriage is lawful.

In February 1960, in response to a query by politician Seow Peck Leng, Lim clarified that Singapore citizens can have only one passport—either a British passport, or a Singapore passport. In March 1960, Lim was promoted to deputy secretary for the Ministry of Home Affairs.

In September 1961, Lim was transferred to the Ministry of Labour, acting as its permanent secretary. On 1 October 1961, Lim was appointed as the chairman of the Central Provident Fund Board (CPF), succeeding James Puthucheary, who had been fired by Minister for Labour and Law K. M. Byrne. In 1962, following complaints from the public that CPF interest rates were too low and should be pegged to Federation of Malaya Employees Provident Fund interest rates, the CPF announced that it might increase interest rates. In the 1960 annual report, Lim estimated that the board's income in 1961 would exceed $9.25 million, and there would be a surplus even if interest rates increased.

In December 1963, at the request of Byrne, the Tourism Promotion Board's chairman, Lim was seconded to the board, serving as its director. On 13 June 1964, during a visit to the board's office, Lim presented William Holden with a lion head's mask used in lion dance as a souvenir.

=== Ministry of Health ===
On 14 June 1965, Lim returned to the civil service, serving as deputy secretary for the Ministry of Health. During this period, there was a dispute between union nurses and the ministry over long hours and poor working conditions. For the dispute hearing in the Industrial Arbitration Court, Lim represented the ministry, and G. Kandasamy represented the Amalgamated Union of Public Employees (AUPE). In September 1965, Kandasamy accused Lim of witness tampering and intimidation, alleging that Lim told four union nurses, who were subpoenaed to give evidence in the hearing, on how they should respond to questions. Lim explained that the witnesses went to his office to seek advice, after receiving the subpoena, and he did not intimidate them. Lim further elaborated that he advised one of the witness to "answer questions in court in a polite way", and to bring along any documents as evidence. Presiding the hearing was Tan Boon Chiang, and he ruled that Lim did not tamper or intimidate any of the witnesses.

On 28 March 1966, Lim testified to the court that out of $77 million of the ministry's budget, $14 million of it was allocated to nurses' salaries. One of the claims made by AUPE was that the nurses should be given back pay from 1963. Lim opposed this idea, and suggested that the court should only award back pay from the decision date. He added that backdating the salary may cause negotiations between the ministry and AUPE to be delayed.

On 30 March 1966, two male nurses, who were assigned to the Opium Treatment Centre on Saint John's Island, claimed that they were "lonesome" due to working full-day shifts. Lim disputed the claim, pointing out that they only completed 5 hours of active duty in a day. While on standby for the remainder of the day, they could spend the time freely.

On 31 March 1966, Kandasamy argued that there would be no nursing applicants if salaries remain the same. Lim testified to the court that the ministry was able to fill up nursing vacancies, as the number of applicants outweigh the number of vacancies.

On 16 May 1966, while making his final submission, Kandasamy said that female trainee nurses should not be dismissed for getting married, and that the marriage ban contradicts Article 16 of the Universal Declaration of Human Rights and the Women's Charter. Lim previously stated that the ministry only imposed the marriage ban on female trainee nurses, as their training would be interrupted if they left to raise their families.

=== Later career ===
In June 1967, Lim succeeded Woon Wah Siang as acting permanent secretary for the Ministry of Culture and Social Affairs. When the ministry split into two in 1968, Lim became acting permanent secretary for the Ministry of Social Affairs. On 22 September 1969, he was transferred to the Ministry of Labour.

On 2 September 1970, Lim succeeded Pang Tee Pow as chairman of CPF. On 31 January 1971, Lim began a yearlong sabbatical before retirement from the civil service. As such, Kwa Soon Chuan took over his positions.

After qualifying as a barrister, Lim received pupillage at R C H Lim and Company, a conveyancing firm started by Richard Lim Chuan Hoe. Subsequently, Lim worked with Francis Seow, and then Freddy Yin Ee Kheng. In 1978, Lim started his own law firm, Lim Joo Hock and Company. He retired in 1998.

== Personal life ==
Lim was a Christian. In 1940s, Lim married Yap Kim Kiaw (1923 – 12 November 2014), a teacher from Seremban, and they had three children—two daughters and a son. His son, Charles Lim (born c. 1949), is an obstetrician and gynaecologist.

In 1957, Lim applied for Singaporean citizenship. Lim played golf since 1961, and he was part of the Singapore Island Country Club.

Lim died in May 2011.

== Publications ==
- Lim, Joo Hock (1952). Chinese Female Immigration into the Straits Settlements 1860–1901 (Thesis). Singapore: University of Malaya in Singapore. OCLC 966423436.

== Legacy ==
- Lim Joo Hock Bursary, a National University of Singapore bursary established in 2011 by Lim, with a S$250,000 donation.
