= William Cheng (civil servant) =

Singaporean civil servant (1928–2010)

William Cheng PPA(P) CPM
- Cheng in 1973

Chairman of the Central Provident Fund Board
- In office 1 January 1973 – 31 January 1979
- Preceded by: Kwa Soon Chuan
- Succeeded by: Han Cheng Fong

Personal details
- Born: 27 December 1928 China
- Died: 10 November 2010 (aged 81) Singapore
- Resting place: Church of St Teresa, Singapore
- Spouse(s): Chai Mei Leng (m. 1955, div. 1999); Lydia Tung Lai Wah (m. ?)
- Children: 6
- Education: Oxford University (MA)

Chinese name
- Traditional Chinese: 鄭維廉
- Simplified Chinese: 郑维廉
Transcriptions
Standard Mandarin
- Hanyu Pinyin: Zhèng Wéilián
- IPA: [ʈʂə̂ŋ.wěɪ.ljɛ̌n]

William Cheng PPA(P) CPM (27 December 1928 – 10 November 2010) was a Singaporean civil servant, and the first trade representative of Singapore to Taiwan, from 1979 to 1988. Cheng was also the chairman of the Central Provident Fund Board from 1973 to 1979.

== Early life and education ==
On 27 December 1928, William Cheng was born in China. He had a brother and four sisters.

Cheng received his early education in Shanghai. In 1951, he graduated from Oxford University with a Master of Arts, majoring in modern European history.

== Career ==
=== Police career ===
Upon graduation, Cheng joined his family in Hong Kong, and began teaching history at the Queen's College. In 1953, Cheng joined the Singapore Police Force as a chief inspector in the Special Branch. In 1955, Cheng was promoted to assistant superintendent, and he was one of the experts in the branch on Chinese affairs and education. Cheng was also the only Master of Arts graduate in the branch, until George Bogaars joined as director of the branch in 1961.

In March 1959, Cheng became a police secretary. He appealed to the public to only report serious accidents to the traffic accidents branch, and minor accidents to the nearest police station, as the branch was overwhelmed with serious and minor accident reports.

On 1 January 1961, Cheng was promoted to the rank of deputy superintendent.

=== Civil career ===
On 1 November 1963, Cheng was transferred to the Administrative Service, serving as the acting principal assistant secretary for the Ministry of Education (MOE). In October 1965, to instill patriotism in schools, Cheng suggested the idea of a national pledge. The idea was supported by Minister for Education Ong Pang Boon, who delegated the task of drafting the pledge to Philip Liau and George Thomson.

In August 1970, Cheng was promoted to acting permanent secretary for MOE. On 11 December 1972, he was transferred to serve as the permanent secretary for the Ministry of Labour. On 1 January 1973, Cheng was appointed as chairman of the Central Provident Fund Board, succeeding Kwa Soon Chuan.

On 1 June 1978, Cheng retired from the civil service, and he was succeeded by Han Cheng Fong. On 31 January 1979, the chairmanship of CPF was also passed on to Han.

=== Later career ===
In February 1979, Cheng joined the Singapore Employers' Federation (now known as Singapore National Employers Federation) as its consultant. He was then posted to Taiwan to serve as the first trade representative of Singapore, holding the position till June 1988. Cheng was succeeded by Tan Chok Kian.

== Personal life ==
=== Marriage and divorce ===
In December 1955, Cheng married Chai Mei Leng, a famous local cabaret singer. Together, they had a son a two daughters.

In early 1985, Chai found out that Cheng had a mistress, Lydia Tung Lai Wah, and began planning for her future by purchasing real estate. In May 1990, Cheng moved out of their matrimonial home in Grove Lane, off Holland Road, and started living with his mistress.

In January 1997, Cheng sued Chai for divorce, on the grounds that they have been separated for more than four years. Cheng lodged a caveat on their S$4 million matrimonial home, and sought to have a share in a condominium flat in Leedon Heights. After a four-day hearing in September 1997, the Family Court granted the divorce with a decree nisi in January 1998.

However, Chai appealed to the High Court. Her lawyer argued that Cheng has been unreasonable, and should not be given the divorce. Chai claimed that Cheng forced her to accept a S$200,000 offer from their son to give up her share in a condominium flat in Valley Park. Chai refused to accept the offer, as she initially bought the property in 1994 for investment, and she subsequently sued her son. As such, Cheng stopped paying her maintenance for seven months and threatened to sue for divorce. In August 1998, Justice Judith Prakash allowed the appeal, and increased the monthly maintenance payable to Chai from S$3,500 to S$4,800.

Following the judgement, Cheng filed an appeal with the Court of Appeal. Presiding the appeal was Chief Justice Yong Pung How, together with Judges of Appeal Justice M. Karthigesu and Justice L.P. Thean. In February 1999, the decision by the High Court was set aside by the judges, and the divorce was upheld. The appeal made it clear that if either spouse can proof that marriage has broken down, divorces are to be granted by the courts.

Later, Cheng married Tung, and they had another three daughters.

==== Insurance ====
In 1985, Cheng also changed the beneficiary of a S$100,000 Aviva life insurance policy from Chai to Tung. However, in 1995, under the Conveyancing and Law of Property Act (CLPA), the High Court ruled that insurance policies were the irrevocable trust of its beneficiaries. As such, Aviva said the change was invalid. Cheng made a new application with the Subordinate Court to contest the validity, and to prevent Chai from receiving the proceeds of the insurance policy.

In March 2004, District Judge Lim Hui Min ruled that the life insurance policy was considered a matrimonial asset that belonged only to Cheng, and that he had the authority to change the policy's beneficiary back to Tung. Lim noted that existing laws such as CLPA, were too inflexible and amendments should carried out.

=== Death ===
On 10 November 2010 at 8:00 am SST, Cheng died.

== Awards and decorations ==
- Colonial Police Medal, in 1957.
- Public Administration Medal (Silver), in 1963.
