= James Puthucheary =

Former Malaysian lawyer (1922–2000)

James Joseph Puthucheary
- Puthucheary in the 1960s

Chairman of the Central Provident Fund Board
- In office 18 July 1959 – September 1961
- Preceded by: Khoo Teck Puat
- Succeeded by: Lim Joo Hock

Personal details
- Born: 25 August 1922 Cochin, Kerala, India
- Died: 3 April 2000 (aged 77) Petaling Jaya, Malaysia
- Cause of death: Stroke
- Spouse: Mavis Colleen Scharenguivel (m. 1959)
- Children: 3
- Relatives: Janil Puthucheary (nephew)
- Education: University of Malaya in Singapore (BA)

James Joseph Puthucheary (25 August 1922 – 3 April 2000) was a Malaysian lawyer, economist and trade unionist. A founding member of the People's Action Party, Puthcheary left the party to join the Barisan Sosialis in 1961 and was detained during Operation Coldstore in 1963. After being released, he was banned from entering Singapore from 1966 to 1990.

== Early life and education ==
On 25 August 1922, James Joseph Puthucheary was born in Alwaye (now known as Aluva), a village located on the outskirts of Cochin in the Indian state of Kerala. His father, Joseph Chacko Puthucheary, was a court interpreter and later a police officer, and his mother, Kunyum Marthri, was a Nasarani. Puthucheary was the eldest among the 10 children. In 1926, his family moved to Muar.

Later, his family moved to Johor Bahru, and Puthucheary attended the Johore English College, before graduating with a School Certificate in 1941.

From 1943 to 1945, during the Japanese Occupation of Malaya, Puthucheary served as an officer in the Indian National Army.

In 1948, Puthucheary was accepted for admission to Raffles College. He was elected as honorary general secretary of the first executive committee of the student union council of the University of Malaya in Singapore, before forming the Malayan Students' Party within the university, with the aims of fostering Malayan civic responsibility and consciousness among students. On 8 January 1951, under the suspicion of being involved with the Malayan Communist Party, Puthucheary was arrested during a raid carried out at the university. Puthucheary was allowed to sit for his undergraduate examinations under the supervision of a Special Branch officer, but he was soon no longer recognised as a student by the university as he was unable to pay the school fees. On 25 June 1952, after about 1.5 years, Puthucheary was released, and applied for readmissions to the university. In 1953, Puthucheary completed a Bachelor of Arts degree, and in 1954, he graduated with an honours degree in economics.

Accused of publishing an allegedly seditious article named "Aggression in Asia" in the Fajar magazine published by the University Socialist Club, Puthucheary was one of the editorial board members that were arrested on 28 May 1954, and all members were bailed out by vice chancellor Sydney Caine. During the trial, students Ong Pang Boon and Ngiam Tong Dow were called as witnesses for the prosecution. Denis Pritt was the lead counsel, and with the assistance of Lee Kuan Yew as the junior counsel, the club won the case and all members were released on 25 August 1954.

== Political career ==
=== People's Action Party (1954–61) ===
On 21 November 1954, the People's Action Party (PAP) was formed, and Puthucheary was one of the founding members. During the 1955 Singaporean general election, Puthucheary supported Devan Nair as a candidate in Farrer Park, but Nair lost to Labour Front candidate Anthony Rebeiro Lazarous. After the election, Puthucheary was appointed as secretary of the Singapore Factory and Shop Workers Union, and participated in talks and supported strikes that fought for better treatment and benefits for workers.

Following the Chinese middle school student riots, Puthucheary was detained along with trade unionists Devan Nair and Lim Chin Siong under Preservation of Public Security Ordinance Act for three years, before being released on 4 June 1959. During his detention, Puthucheary was barred from seeing his lawyer Lee Kuan Yew and participating in the 1959 Singaporean general election. He also published a book titled "Ownership and Control in the Malayan Economy" and passed the intermediate examination in law conducted by the University of London. Puthucheary objected to the government's decision to transfer all political detainees to the detention centre located on Saint John's Island, and remained to be housed at Changi Prison.

After being released in 1959, Puthucheary was appointed as manager of the Industrial Promotion Board, leading the government's plan to set up a S$100 million economic development board for Singapore. During his tenure, Puthucheary represented Singapore for economic-related conferences in New Delhi, Bangkok and London. Puthucheary also succeeded Khoo Teck Puat as the chairman of the Central Provident Fund Board.

=== Barisan Sosialis (1961–66) ===
On 1 August 1961, Puthucheary announced his resignation from the government and that he would join the Barisan Socialis, a party formed by members expelled from the PAP. He also took on a job as assistant lecturer in economics at the University of Malay. Minister for Finance Goh Keng Swee clarified in a statement that Puthucheary's resignation was arranged prior to the beginning of conflict within PAP. Puthucheary was appointed as advisor of the Barisan Socialis. In September 1961, Puthucheary was fired as chairman of the Central Provident Fund Board by Minister for Labour and Law K. M. Byrne. Puthucheary remained as panel member of the Industrial Arbitration Court, and a lecturer in economics at the University of Malaya in Singapore.

Under Operation Coldstore, Puthucheary was arrested and released on 28 November 1963, after declaring that he opposes communism and "want nothing more to do with" it.

On 22 October 1966, Puthucheary and his brother, Dominic Puthucheary, were banned from entering Singapore, as the government had categorised their presence to be "undesirable in the interest of public security". Subsequently, Puthucheary moved to Kuala Lumpur to practice law. His ban was lifted in 1990.

== Personal life ==
Puthucheary met Mavis Colleen Scharenguivel when both of them were studying at the University of Malaya in Singapore, and remained as close friends after graduation. On 8 June 1959, after Puthucheary was released from prison, he married Scharenguivel by a special licence granted by Minister of Home Affairs Ong Pang Boon. However, Minister for Labour and Law K. M. Byrne announced that Mrs Puthucheary's appointment as assistant director of the Department of Social Welfare became temporary upon marriage, and terminated her duties at the end of September 1959. After the termination, Mrs Puthucheary was appointed as assistant secretary at the Ministry of Education.

In 1963, after Puthucheary was detained under Operation Coldstore, his wife was served with a notice of dismissal, citing security reasons. But, Prime Minister Lee Kuan Yew felt distressed that her dismissal coincided with her pregnancy and Puthucheary's detention, and decided to intervene, allowing Mrs Puthucheary to keep her role in the Ministry of Education.

On 3 April 2000, Puthucheary died after suffering from a stroke. Puthucheary had a daughter and two sons.

== Bibliography ==
- Puthucheary, James Joseph (1959). Ownership and Control in the Malayan Economy: A Study of the Structure of Ownership and Control and Its Effects on the Development of Secondary Industries and Economic Growth in Malaya and Singapore. Singapore: Donald Moore.
