= Kwa Soon Chuan =

Singaporean civil servant (1922–2010)

- Kwa in 1950

Chairman of the Central Provident Fund Board
- In office 22 February 1971 – 1 January 1973
- Preceded by: Lim Joo Hock
- Succeeded by: William Cheng

Personal details
- Born: 17 June 1922 Singapore, Straits Settlements
- Died: 12 November 2010 (aged 88) Singapore
- Spouse: Ivy Lim Seok Cheng (m. 1949)
- Children: 2
- Parents: Kwa Siew Tee (father); Wee Yew Neo (mother)
- Education: Raffles College; Anglo-Chinese School (Barker Road)

Chinese name
- Traditional Chinese: 柯順全
- Simplified Chinese: 柯顺全
Transcriptions
Standard Mandarin
- Hanyu Pinyin: Kē Shùnquán
- IPA: [kʰɤ̀.ʂwə̂n.tɕʰyǎn]

Kwa Soon Chuan (17 June 1922 – 12 November 2010) was a Singaporean civil servant, who served as chairman of the Central Provident Fund Board from 1971 to 1973. He was also the first Singaporean to be appointed to the Colonial Administration Service in 1950.

== Early life and education ==
On 17 June 1922, Kwa Soon Chuan was born. He was the fourth son of Kwa Siew Tee, who was the former general manager of Oversea-Chinese Bank and Singapore Municipal Commissioner. His mother, Wee Yew Neo, was a Teochew who came from Shantou, China.

Kwa received his early education at the Anglo-Chinese School (Barker Road), and played cricket in the school team. He obtained a Junior Cambridge in 1939, and a Senior Cambridge in 1940.

Later, Kwa enrolled in Raffles College. During the Japanese occupation of Singapore, his education was disrupted. In 1948, Kwa graduated with a diploma in arts.

== Career ==
In April 1950, Kwa was the first Singaporean to be directly appointed to the Colonial Administration Service. Upon returning from an administrative officers' course in the United Kingdom, named the Devonshire course, Kwa was appointed as acting deputy commissioner of lands. In 1959, Kwa was promoted to commissioner of lands.

In 1960, Kwa was transferred to serve as the deputy commissioner of valuation. In December 1960, Former Minister of National Development Ong Eng Guan questioned this appointment, and suggested that Kwa was given the appointment not by merit, but because he was the brother-in-law of Prime Minister Lee Kuan Yew. A Commission of Inquiry was set up to inquire the alleged nepotism.

In January 1961, Phay Seng Whatt, a member of the Public Service Commission (PSC), testified that he was not influenced by any minister when he recommended Kwa for the transfer. Lim Eng Bee, chairman of PSC, added that Kwa had stronger credentials as compared to another candidate. Lim Kim San, deputy chairman of PSC, reaffirmed that there was no influence by any minister when considering Kwa for the position.

During the sixth day of the inquiry, Kwa testified that he did not meet Lee in connection with his promotion, and that he only met Lee during Chinese New Year and his father's birthday party. In February 1961, Justice Frederick Arthur Chua ruled that the alleged nepotism claim by Ong was "untrue, groundless and reckless".

In 1965, Kwa was appointed as the registrar of vehicles, and held the position till 8 January 1967. He was succeeded by H. F. G. Leembruggen. Kwa was then appointed as the deputy permanent secretary to the Ministry of Social Affairs. Kwa replaced Lim Joo Hock as permanent secretary to the Ministry of Labour on 1 February 1971, and as chairman of the Central Provident Fund Board (CPF) on 22 February 1971. Kwa was also appointed as the commissioner of labour. In June 1971, Kwa led the Singapore delegation to the Benzene Convention.

On 11 December 1972, Kwa was transferred to the Ministry of Culture as its permanent secretary. Later, on 31 December, Kwa was also appointed as the chairman of the National Theatre Trust. Kwa appealed to organisations, firms and members of the public to become regular sponsors of its shows, so that shows could be planned on a long-term basis.

On 1 January 1973, Kwa was succeeded by William Cheng as chairman of CPF. In June 1977, after 26 years of service, Kwa retired from the civil service.

== Personal life ==
Kwa had four sisters and four brothers. (Note: His brothers, namely, Kwa Soon Hock, Kwa Soon Lock, Kwa Soon Siew, and Kwa Soon Bee. His sisters, namely, Kwa Geok Neo, Kwa Geok Lan, Kwa Geok Choo, and Kwa Geok Eng.) One of his sisters, Kwa Geok Choo, was a Singaporean lawyer and the wife of Lee Kuan Yew. His brother, Kwa Soon Bee, served as a permanent secretary for the Ministry of Health.

In 1949, Kwa married Ivy Lim Seok Cheng, the second daughter of Lim Chong Pang. They have a son and a daughter. His daughter, Kwa Kim Li, is a lawyer and the managing partner of Lee & Lee.

On 12 November 2010, Kwa died.
