= Central Provident Fund =

Statutory board administering national savings and pension plan

Central Provident Fund Board

Agency overview
- Formed: 1 July 1955; 71 years ago
- Jurisdiction: Government of Singapore
- Headquarters: 238B Thomson Road, #08-00, Novena Square Tower B, Singapore 307685
- Agency executives: Yong Ying-I, Chairman; Melissa Khoo, CEO
- Parent agency: Ministry of Manpower
- Website: www.cpf.gov.sg
- Agency ID: T08GB0007E

The Central Provident Fund Board (CPFB), commonly known as the CPF Board or simply the Central Provident Fund (CPF), is a compulsory comprehensive savings and pension plan for working Singaporeans and permanent residents primarily to fund their retirement, healthcare, and housing needs in Singapore.

The CPF is an employment-based savings scheme with the help of employers and employees contributing a mandated amount to the fund for their benefits. It is administered by the Central Provident Fund Board, a statutory board operating under the Ministry of Manpower which is responsible for investing contributions. The 2026 Marsh CFA Institute Global Pension Index ranked Singapore's retirement income system, of which CPF is a key component, fourth worldwide and highest in Asia, awarding it an 'A' grade for the second consecutive year.

CPF savings are invested by the CPF Board in Government-issued Special Singapore Government Securities (SSGS), which are guaranteed by the Singapore Government. The proceeds from SSGS issuance are pooled with other Government funds and invested through GIC Private Limited (GIC), formerly known as the Government of Singapore Investment Corporation. GIC is a Government-owned investment management company that manages these pooled assets on behalf of the Government, with the aim of achieving long-term investment returns.

As of 2026, the CPF managed US$436 billion for 4.2 million account holders.

== History ==
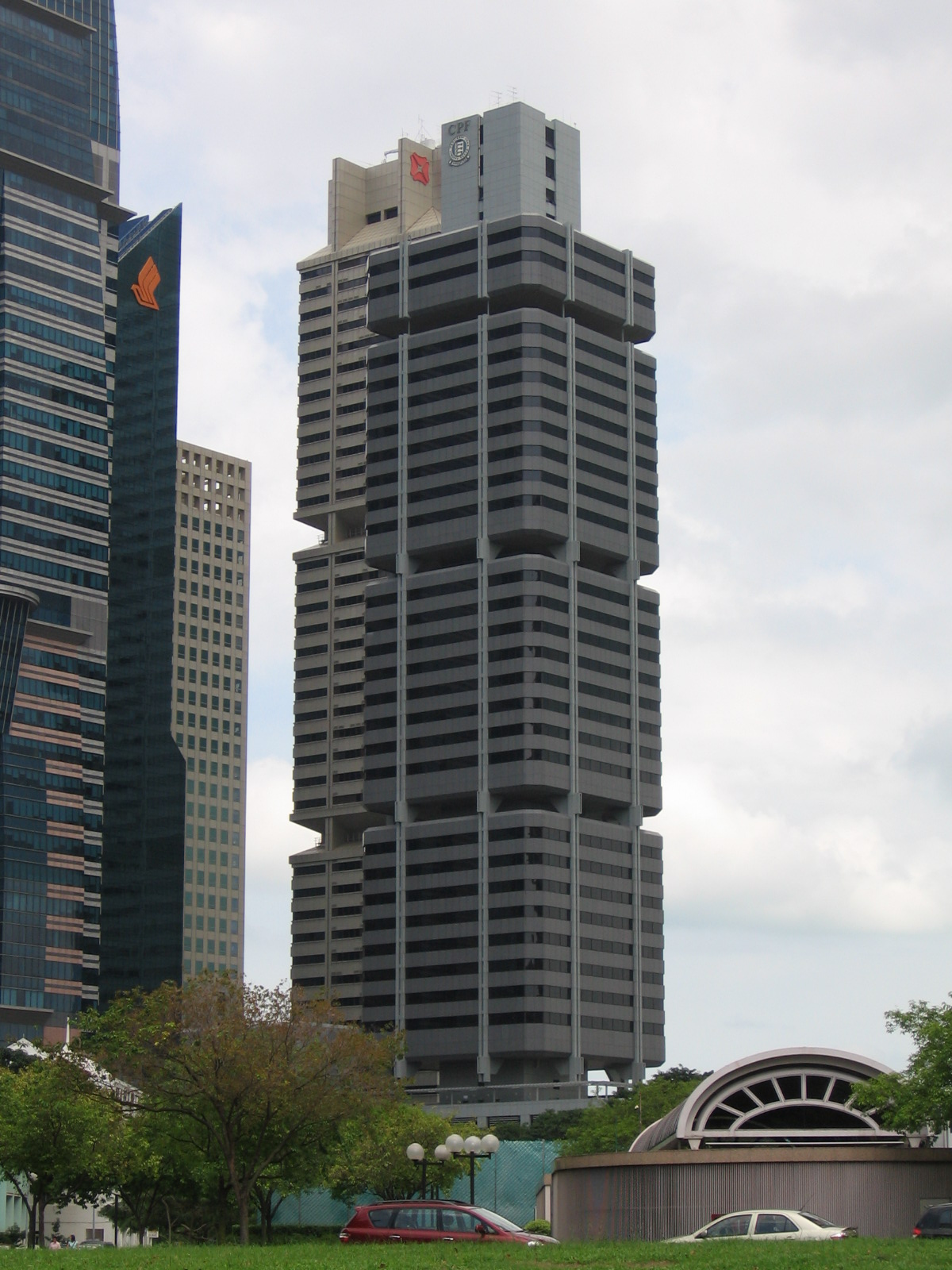
CPF Building, previously headquarters of the CPF Board, is located on Robinson Road. It was sold to Ascendas Land in 2015 with the last tenant moving out on 20 February 2017.

British colonial authorities in Singapore implemented a proposal by David Marshall via the Progressive Party committee, to create the Central Provident Fund in 1955 as a compulsory savings scheme to assist workers in retirement provision without needing to introduce a more extensive and costly old age pension, as was the norm in Britain at the time. Money contributed to the Central Provident Fund earned a nominal rate of return. Lee Kuan Yew promoted the Central Provident Fund (CPF) as a core pillar of Singapore's social security system after independence, further expanding it to bolster economic progress.

The Central Provident Fund was expanded in 1968 to provide for housing expenses under the Public Housing Scheme. In 1984 the Central Provident Fund was again expanded to cover medical care expenses. In 1986 an investment option was added to give members the opportunity to manage their own risk and returns.

In 1987, the Minimum Retirement Sum Scheme annuity was introduced. In 1990, MediShield health insurance funded by Central Provident Fund savings, was launched to provide universal healthcare to all Singaporeans. Later programs includes interest rate top up of 1% for the first $60,000 of retirement savings, the Workfare Income Supplement which supplements retirement savings for low-income older workers, and the Pioneer Generation Package which provides additional support for the medical expenses of older workers.

When the CPF was started in 1955, both employees and employers contributed 5% of an employee's pay to the scheme. The rate of contribution was progressively increased to 25% for both employers and employees in 1985. The employer contribution was cut to 10% during a recession in 1986. The employer contribution rate was reverted to match the employee rate until the 1997–1998 Asian Financial Crisis, and thereafter lowered to 10% for workers 55 years or younger. Since then, the employer contribution rate has been gradually increased. Employers currently contribute 3 fewer percentage points of salaries over S$750 for employees up to 55 years old.

== Overview ==
=== Accounts and interest rates ===
Employees and employers are required to make monthly contributions to the following CPF accounts:

- Ordinary Account (OA) – for housing, pay for CPF insurance, investment and education.
- Special Account (SA) – for old age and investment in retirement-related financial products.
- Medisave Account (MA) – for hospitalisation and approved medical insurance.

When members turn 55, their Retirement Account (RA) is created using savings from their SA, followed by their OA if necessary, up to the Full Retirement Sum (FRS). The RA is used to meet retirement needs during old age. The SA is closed for members aged 55 and above.

CPF savings earn a minimum interest of 2.5% per annum for OA, while SA, MA and RA currently benefit from a 4% interest rate floor. Members aged below 55 earn an extra 1% interest on the first $60,000 of their combined CPF balances, capped at $20,000 from OA. Members aged 55 and above earn an extra 2% interest on the first $30,000 of their combined balances and an extra 1% on the next $30,000, also capped at $20,000 from OA.

=== CPF contribution rates ===
From 1 January 2027, for employees aged 55 and below, the total CPF contribution rate will be 37% (17% employer, 20% employee). For those above 55 to 60, it will be 35.5% (16.5% employer, 19% employee). For those above 60 to 65, it will be 26% (13% employer, 13% employee). For those above 65 to 70, it will remain 16.5% (9% employer, 7.5% employee). For those above 70, it will remain 12.5% (7.5% employer, 5% employee).

From 1 January 2025, CPF contributions were extended to platform workers, such as private-hire car drivers and delivery riders who provide services through digital platforms. Platform operators are required to make CPF contributions for workers born in 1995 or later, as well as older workers who opt in, with contribution rates being progressively increased from 2025 to 2029.

=== CPF ordinary wage (OW) ceiling ===
CPF OW ceiling is being progressively raised from S$6,000 to S$8,000 by 2026.

- Before 1 September 2023: S$6,000
- 1 September 2023: S$6,300
- 1 January 2024: S$6,800
- 1 January 2025: S$7,400
- 1 January 2026: S$8,000

== Retirement schemes ==
=== CPF retirement sums ===
When members turn 55, CPF savings from their SA, followed by their OA, are transferred to their RA up to the Full Retirement Sum (FRS) to provide for their retirement needs. Members with insufficient savings are not required to make top-ups to meet the FRS. The Minimum Sum was introduced in 1987, initially set at $30,000, to provide members with monthly payouts during retirement. In 2016, it was renamed the Retirement Sum. The Retirement Sum consists of three levels – Basic Retirement Sum (BRS), FRS and Enhanced Retirement Sum (ERS). FRS is set at two times BRS, while ERS is currently set at four times BRS. ERS is optional. Members can receive monthly payouts from their Payout Eligibility Age, either for life under CPF LIFE or under the Retirement Sum Scheme until their savings are depleted.

Members aged 55 and above who have set aside their FRS can withdraw their remaining OA savings. Eligible property owners may also withdraw their RA savings above the BRS, subject to conditions including generally having a property with a remaining lease lasting until at least age 95. Upon the sale or transfer of the property, CPF savings used for the property must be refunded with accrued interest, together with any pledged RA withdrawal amounts, subject to the applicable refund rules.

The retirement sums for successive cohorts have increased over the years to account for inflation and longer life expectancies. The FRS for members who turned 55 in 2026 was $220,400. Over the years, the Payout Eligibility Age has been progressively raised from 60 to 65, with the age set at 65 for members born in 1954 or later. For the cohort who turned 55 in 2022, about 50% of active members met the FRS fully in cash, while about 30% were unable to meet the FRS in cash or through a mixture of cash and property.

=== CPF Life ===
Members born in 1958 or later with at least $60,000 in retirement savings when they start receiving monthly payouts will be automatically included in CPF LIFE and asked to select a CPF LIFE annuity plan, which will give them an income for life, starting from their chosen payout age. The three CPF LIFE plans are the Escalating Plan, Standard Plan and Basic Plan. Those who are not on CPF LIFE can choose to join it or receive monthly payouts under the Retirement Sum Scheme (formerly known as the Minimum Sum Scheme).

Unlike CPF LIFE, payouts under that scheme are calculated to last up to 20 years, with extra interest potentially extending the payout period. Members who choose to join CPF LIFE voluntarily do not need a minimum amount of RA savings; however, the monthly payout depends on their RA savings. Thus, members with lower RA balances will generally receive lower monthly payouts. Members who have a life annuity from an insurance company that provides equivalent benefits to CPF LIFE may be exempted from joining the scheme.

== Medical schemes ==
=== Medisave ===
Medisave may be used to cover self or dependents' hospitalisation expenses. It may also be used for certain outpatient treatments like chemotherapy and radiotherapy treatments.

The Basic Healthcare Sum (BHS) is the maximum amount a citizen member can have in their MediSave account and is the estimated savings they need in their MediSave Account for their basic subsidised healthcare needs in old age. Part of citizen members' working contributions will be allocated to their MA until their balance reaches the Basic Healthcare Sum (BHS). Amounts above the BHS will be transferred to citizen members' other CPF accounts, depending on their age.

The BHS for members who turn 65 in 2026 is $79,000 and remains fixed for the rest of their lives. BHS for members who are below 65 in 2026 is $79,000 and will be adjusted yearly. Members do not need to make any top-up if they do not have the BHS. Policies on Medisave usage and BHS is determined by the Ministry of Health.

=== Medishield Life ===
MediShield Life is a basic health insurance scheme that covers all Singapore Citizens and Permanent Residents, helping them meet the costs of large hospital bills and selected costly outpatient treatments. MediSave savings may be used to cover the premiums for MediShield Life. Similar to MediSave, policies on MediShield Life coverage, usage and premiums are set by the Ministry of Health, while the day-to-day operational aspects are run by CPF Board.

== Protection schemes ==
=== Eldershield ===
ElderShield is a severe disability insurance scheme that provides monthly cash payouts of $300 or $400 for up to 5 or 6 years, depending on the plan. Until 2019, Singapore Citizens and Permanent Residents with MediSave Accounts were automatically enrolled in ElderShield at age 40, unless they opted out. Automatic enrolment into ElderShield was discontinued in 2020, with younger cohorts instead covered under CareShield Life. To make a claim under ElderShield, a person must lose the ability to perform at least three of six activities of daily living: washing, dressing, feeding, toileting, mobility and transferring.

As of 2018, depending on the payout, entry age and gender, the annual premium for Eldershield ranges from $152 to $3132. This premium is non-guaranteed and may be adjusted in the future.

According to Minister for Health Gan Kim Yong, about $2.6 billion have been collected in premiums for ElderShield, out of which around $100 million have been paid out in claims and $130 million in premium rebates from its inception in 2002 to end 2015. According to Gan Kim Yong, ElderShield collects premiums while the policyholder is aged 40 to 65, and provides lifetime coverage from age 40, even after the policyholder reaches 65 and stops paying premiums. The total amount of premiums collected exceed the amount of claims paid to-date because the premiums collected are meant to provide coverage against future claims throughout policyholders' lifetime.

=== Careshield Life ===
CareShield Life replaced ElderShield for younger cohorts when it was launched on 1 October 2020. Singapore Citizens and Permanent Residents born in 1980 or later are automatically covered under CareShield Life from 1 October 2020 or when they turn 30, whichever is later. Similar to ElderShield, to claim under CareShield Life, an insured person must be unable to perform at least three out of six activities of daily living. CareShield Life premiums are generally payable until age 67 for members who join before age 59, compared with age 65 under ElderShield. Unlike ElderShield, members born in 1980 or later cannot opt out of CareShield Life. Premiums are subject to periodic adjustments. CareShield Life provides monthly payouts for as long as the insured remains severely disabled, unlike ElderShield, which provides payouts for a limited period.

=== Dependents' Protection Scheme ===
The Dependents' Protection Scheme (DPS) provides insured members and/or their families with some money to get through the first few years should the insured members meet an untimely death, suffer from terminal Illness or total permanent disability. DPS covers insured members up to 65 years old. Members up to 60 years old will be covered for a maximum sum assured of $70,000. For members above age 60 and up to age 65, DPS covers them up to a maximum sum assured of $55,000. The annual premium increases with age, from $18 for 34 years old and below, to $298 for those 60 to 64 years old.

== Housing schemes ==
The Ordinary Account savings can be used to purchase a home under the CPF housing schemes. A Housing and Development Board (HDB) flat may be purchased under the Public Housing Scheme, or a private property under the Residential Properties Scheme. CPF savings may be used for full or partial payment of the property, and to service the monthly housing payments. With effect from 20 Aug 2024, the Loan-to-Value (LTV) limit for HDB loans was lowered from 80% to 75%. This brings the LTV limit for HDB loans in line with loans granted by financial institutions, which remains at 75% for first home loans. If a flat is purchased under the Public Housing Scheme, mortgage insurance under the Home Protection Scheme will be necessary.

== Investment scheme ==
CPF members may invest their Ordinary Account balance under the CPF Investment Scheme – Ordinary Account (CPFIS-OA) and their Special Account balance under the CPF Investment Scheme – Special Account (CPFIS-SA), subject to caps. Assets that may be invested includes Insurance, unit trusts, Exchange Traded Funds (ETFs), Fixed Deposits, Bonds and Treasury Bills, Shares, Property Fund and Gold. From 1 July 2010, only monies in excess of $20,000 in the Ordinary Account and $40,000 in the Special Account can be invested. Profits made from investments are not withdrawable but members do not have to make any top-up to their CPF if they incur losses on investments.

== CPF withdrawal ==
From 2003 to 2013, CPF members who left Singapore withdrew SGD$426 million, or 0.3 per cent of the average total members' balances each year.

From 2013 to 2017, an annual average of 13,500 CPF members, or 0.4% of total CPF members, withdrew their CPF monies when they left Singapore.

=== Conditions for withdrawal ===
CPF savings can be withdrawn on the following grounds:

- Anyone who has renounced their Singaporean citizenship or permanent residency. The CPF accounts will be closed
- Conditional partial withdrawal for those with reduced life expectancy due to a medical condition; who are certified permanently unfit for work; or permanently lack the mental capacity to make decisions.
- CPF members who are 55 years and older, and have met the conditions for withdrawal

== CPF nomination ==
CPF nominations allow members to specify how their CPF savings will be distributed after their death. By default, CPF members' nominees receive the deceased's savings in cash.

== Controversies ==
=== Comparison with City Harvest Church Fund ===
On 15 May 2014, Roy Ngerng made a post entitled "Where Your CPF Money Is Going: Learning From The City Harvest Trial" on his blog the Heart Truths. Within the post, Ngerng created a chart which mapped the relationships between the Prime Minister of Singapore, Lee Hsien Loong, the Central Provident Fund (CPF), the Monetary Authority of Singapore (MAS), Temasek Holdings and the Government of Singapore Investment Corporation (GIC). Ngerng claimed there was an "uncanny resemblance" between this chart and another chart by news agency Channel NewsAsia regarding the relationship among City Harvest Church leaders, who were being charged with misappropriating funds.

The CPF has been described as "a forced savings scheme" for Singaporeans with "monthly contributions into the fund" to be saved for retirement, or for expenses on "property, healthcare, and their children's education", while the GIC has been described to have "indirectly invested" funds from the CPF. Singapore's Ministry of Finance on its part has put forth its explanation as to why CPF funds are invested in Special Singapore Government Securities, to enable CPF Board to be able to pay its members all their monies when due, and the interest that it commits to pay on CPF accounts. The government securities are invested as part of a combined pool of funds managed by GIC, rather than managed in a separate dedicated fund, as a standalone fund would have to be managed conservatively to avoid the risk of failing to meet obligations to CPF members.

On 18 May, PM Lee responded through his lawyer Davinder Singh, who stated that the blog post alleged that Lee "is guilty of criminal misappropriation of the monies paid by Singaporeans to the CPF" and that the allegations were "false and baseless".

Ngerng said that the article was a call for greater transparency on the CPF, the GIC and Temasek Holdings. and called for PM Lee to rebut the points made in his blog post. Singapore's Ministry of Finance has publicly stated that CPF monies are safe as all CPF monies are invested in securities that are issued and guaranteed by the Singapore Government, which is one of the few remaining triple-A credit-rated governments in the world.

On 23 May, Ngerng apologized "unreservedly", admitting that his allegation was "false and completely without foundation".

On 29 May, Prime Minister Lee filed a defamation lawsuit against Ngerng. In a 4 August affidavit, Ngerng argued that his blog post had been misunderstood, and that he was merely asking for more transparency and accountability for CPF monies. On 7 November, the High Court of Singapore found Ngerng liable of defamation with damages to be assessed, which was the first such ruling in Singapore over a purely online article. Judge Lee Seiu Kin ruled that there was "no triable defence" and "no doubt that it is defamatory to suggest that the plaintiff is guilty of criminal misappropriation". An injunction against Ngerng was granted, barring him from publishing future similar accusations regarding PM Lee and the CPF. Ngerng expressed disappointment at the verdict, but maintained that he would "still continue to speak up on the CPF and other issues that concern Singaporeans".

On 17 December 2015, the court led by Lee handed down a judgement ordering Ngerng to pay S$100,000 in general damages and S$50,000 in aggravated damages. Ngerng, through his lawyer, Eugene Thuraisingam proposed to pay the S$150,000 in instalments which was granted by the Prime Minister on the condition that Ngerng paid the S$30,000 in hearing costs immediately i.e. by 16 March 2016. Ngerng is expected to repay $100 a month from 1 April 2016 onwards over five years until 1 April 2021 when instalments are increased to S$1,000 until the full sum has been paid by the year 2033. Lee also rejected Ngerng's request to reimburse part of the damages i.e. S$36,000.

== Membership ==
=== Chairmen ===
List of chairmen with years served
Name	Years served	Notes
Ernest Leslie Peake	1954–1957	
Robert Charles Kendall	1954, 1957–1958	
Khoo Teck Puat	1958–1959	
James Puthucheary	1959–1961	
Lim Joo Hock	1961–1963	
K. M. Byrne	1963–1966	
Pang Tee Pow	1966–1970	
Lim Joo Hock	1970–1971	
Kwa Soon Chuan	1971–1973	
William Cheng	1973–1979	
Han Cheng Fong	1979–1980	
Tan Chok Kian	1980–1986	
Lim Siong Guan	1986–1994	
Andrew Chew	1994–1998	
Ngiam Tong Dow	1998–2001	
Koh Yong Guan	2001	
Moses Lee Kim Poo	2002–2005	
Koh Yong Guan	2005–2013	
Chiang Chie Foo	2013–2021	
Yong Ying-I	2021–present	

=== General managers ===
List of general managers with years served
Name	Years served	Notes
Kenneth Robert Malcolm	1954–1955	
H. S. Robinson	1955–1957	
Charles E. Green	1957–1973	
Robert Iau	1973–1980	
Richard Lau	1980	
Tan Chok Kian	1980–1986	
Lim Han Soon	1987–2002	
Willie Tan Yoke Meng	2002–c. 2004	

=== Chief executives ===
List of chief executives with years served
Name	Years served	Notes
Willie Tan Yoke Meng	c. 2004–2005	
Liew Heng San	2005–2010	
Yee Ping Yi	2011–2015	
Ng Chee Peng	2015–2019	
Augustin Lee	2019–2023	
Melissa Khoo	2023–present	

== See also ==
- Central Provident Fund (South Africa)
- Social security
- Employees Provident Fund, Malaysia's Provident Fund
- Economy of Singapore
- Provident fund (disambiguation)

=== Similar systems elsewhere ===
- National Insurance (UK)
- Social Security in France
- South African Social Security Agency
- Social Security (United States)
- Social security in Sweden
- Social security in Australia
- Canada Pension Plan
- Mandatory Provident Fund (Hong Kong)
