= A.G.S. Danaraj =

Singaporean journalist and town planner (1931–1981)

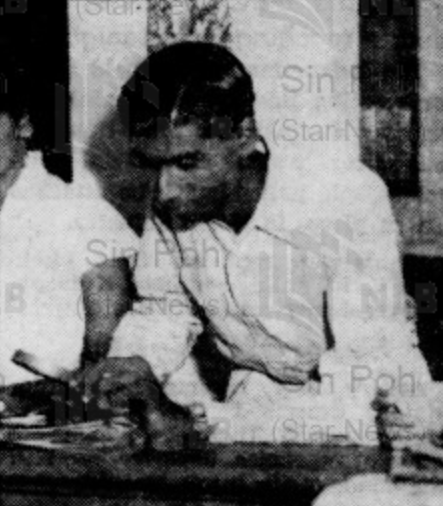
Danaraj in 1953.

A.G.S. Danaraj (11 September 1931 – 27 July 1981) was a prominent Singaporean newsreader, journalist, town planner and social worker. He was the author of Mysticism in Malaya, the president of the Singapore Institute of Planners and the founding president of the local branch of the Organization for Industrial, Spiritual and Cultural Advancement International.

== Early life and education ==
Danaraj was born Pahang, Malaysia in 1831. He and his family came to Singapore in 1940 and he received his education at the Saint Andrew's School from 1947 to 1949.

== Career ==
In 1950, Danaraj was hired at the Singapore Improvement Trust as a draughtsman. In 1951, he was appointed to the team which organised "Homes of Singapore", an exhibition of the trust held at the Victoria Memorial Hal. In September 1953, the trust announced that it would be training eight locals, including Danaraj, in town planning and engineering for "top" town planning posts. He was then an assistant. In August 1954, he was elected the honorary assistant secretary of the Singapore Improvement Trust Junior Officers' Association. In June of the following year, he was elected the association's assistant secretary. In this period, he also served on George Pepler's Diagnostic Survey Team, who were involved in the designing of the 20-year Master Plan. He was also appointed the editor of the Singapore Improvement Trust's Local Officers' News Bulletin. In 1958, Danaraj was awarded a scholarship to study town planning at the Durham University in Durham, England. He left in June and remained there for two years before graduating from the university with a Diploma in Town and Country Planning. In early 1960, while in England, he became the founding chairman of the St. Thomas Youth Group. He also toured France, Italy, Belgium and Germany to study modern town planning in those countries. He returned to Singapore in July. While at the university, he freelanced for five newspapers and covered the 1958 St Ann's riots in Nottingham. After returning from England, he underwent six months of training before becoming a broadcaster with Radio Singapore. He served as a newsreader. By January 1961, Danaraj had joined the Government Planning Department in the Prime Minister's Office as a planner. In that month, he was elected an associate member of the Royal Town Planning Institute in London.

In January 1965, Danaraj's Mysticism in Malaya, was published by the Asia Publishing Company. He was then working as a freelance journalist. For the book, he claimed to have met over 300 bomohs in the region. However, David Sze, a literary critic with The Straits Times, opined that the book "disappoints" and noted that it is "not a study of mysticism". Sze noted that the book contains assertions by Danaraj that there are "innumerable authentic cases where spirits of dead persons have appeared in many forms", yet "authenticates none of them." Danaraj was one of two representatives for the country of Malaysia at the 1965 Organization for Industrial, Spiritual and Cultural Advancement International conference, held in Tokyo. In September 1966, he was elected the president of the Singapore Indian Music Party. Danaraj was a member of the 22-man delegation sent to the 1967 Organization for Industrial, Spiritual and Cultural Advancement International conference, held in Kuala Lumpur. He had been appointed the organisation's representative in Singapore and was then tasked with setting up a local branch of the organisation. The branch was formed in September and Danaraj was elected its founding president. He was the head of the four-man delegation sent to attend the organisation's second supreme council meeting, held in Tokyo from 10 to 21 April 1968. The Eastern Sun reported in October that he was still working with Radio Singapura part-time and that he had done all the English announcements for the Sansui announcing tower at the New Era Exposition. By May 1971, he had become a part-time lecturer at the Faculty of Architecture at the University of Singapore.

In 1972, Danaraj was made a fellow of the Singapore Institute of Planners and the Royal Town Planning Institute. By July 1975, he had become the principal planner of the Development Control Division of the Ministry of National Development. He was elected a member of the council of the Singapore Institute of Planners in that year. Danaraj was elected its vice-president the following year and in 1977 was elected the institute's president, serving in this position for two years. In April 1978, he attended a conference in Manila aiming to establish an ASEAN Institute of Planners with other heads of planning institutes from the other countries in ASEAN. In September, he led a 10-man delegation from the institute on a study-tour of Thailand. In 1979, Danaraj was elected the chairman of the Singapore Institute of Planners' Practice, Membership and Education Committee. He was also "largely responsible" for the founding of the ASEAN Association for Planning and Housing, having initially suggested the idea.

== Personal life and death ==
On 26 May 1971, Danaraj married Lily Teo, whom he had met seven years ago at a youth meeting, at the St. Andrew's Cathedral. Together, they had two children. Danaraj was also a social worker. In September 1960, he was elected the founding president of the Anglican Majlis, a "senior youth" group at the St. Andrew's Cathedral. The Singapore Free Press reported in January 1961 that he was an "active St. Andrew's Cathedral worker". In September, he was elected the chairman of the Service and Welfare Committee of the St. Andrew's Cathedral. Danaraj was also a member of the Singapore Red Cross Society and served at the master of ceremonies at several of its events. He began serving as the chairman of the society's Property and Estates Committee in 1965 and was awarded the Meritorious Service Award for his work with the organisation in 1979.

Danaraj died on 27 July 1981.
