= Institute of Systems Science =

Technology school at National University of Singapore

Institute of Systems Science, National University of Singapore
- Other names: NUS-ISS 新加坡国立大学系统科学学院
- Type: Technology school
- Established: 1981
- Parent institution: National University of Singapore
- Location: Singapore
- Website: iss.nus.edu.sg

The Institute of Systems Science (abbreviated as NUS-ISS) is a technology school at the National University of Singapore. It was established in 1981. The school offers programmes including the Master of Technology and Graduate Diploma in Systems Analysis.

== History ==
In 1981, the institution was established and began offering a Graduate Diploma in Systems Analysis. That same year, it initiated senior executive seminars and IT project management training, collaborating with IBM for four years. By 1984, the institute had relocated to its premises at 21 Heng Mui Keng Terrace. It expanded into large-scale R&D in 1985. Two years later, in 1987, it worked with the National Computer Board and the Singapore Economic Development Board on the Small Enterprise Computerisation Programme, aimed at SMEs.

== See also ==
- National University of Singapore
- Technology education
