= Civil Service College Singapore =

Coordinates: 1.3097°N 103.7896°E

- Kolej Perkhidmatan Awam (Malay) 新加坡公共服务学院 (Chinese) அரசாங்கச் சேவைப் பயிற்சிக்கழகம் (Tamil)

Agency overview
- Formed: 1 October 2001; 25 years ago
- Jurisdiction: Government of Singapore
- Headquarters: 31 North Buona Vista Road, Singapore 275983
- Agency executives: Tan Gee Keow, Permanent Secretary; Han Neng Hsiu, Dean & CEO
- Parent agency: Public Service Division, Prime Minister's Office
- Website: www.csc.gov.sg
- Agency ID: T08GB0009H

Civil Service College Singapore (CSC; Malay: Kolej Perkhidmatan Awam, Chinese: 新加坡公共服务学院, Tamil: அரசாங்கச் சேவைப் பயிற்சிக்கழகம்) is a statutory board of the Government of Singapore under the Public Service Division of the Prime Minister's Office. Established in its present statutory form in 2001, the college is responsible for the learning and development of officers across the Singapore Civil Service. Its activities include professional and leadership development, capability building, organisational development and the sharing of knowledge and practices across government agencies.

== History ==
=== Staff Training Institute ===
The origins of the Civil Service College can be traced to the Staff Training Institute (STI), which was officially opened on 15 March 1971, by the then Finance Minister Hon Sui Sen. Before its establishment, training within the Singapore Civil Service was largely conducted on an ad hoc, on-the-job basis within individual government ministries and departments. The expansion of the government's responsibilities following Singapore's independence in 1965 created a need for a more systematic approach to developing the administrative and management capabilities of civil servants.

In June 1975, the institute was renamed the Civil Service Staff Development Institute (CSSDI) when it relocated from its original location off Lorong Langsir along Stevens Road, to a S$5 million complex along Heng Mui Keng Terrace in Kent Ridge. It was then renamed again as the Civil Service Institute (CSI) in May 1979.

=== Civil Service College ===
Old satellite campus of Civil Service College at Wallich Street

Separately, the government had established the Civil Service College in 1993, to provide development and policy making training for senior civil servants. In April 1996, both the Civil Service Institute and this college was merged to form the present Civil Service College, which created a central institution for training officers across different levels of the public service. The college initially continued operating from its Kent Ridge campus, before moving to a new training facility at Buona Vista in 1998. The college's satellite campus along Wallich Street was also consolidated into the new building in Buona Vista.

On 1 October 2001, the Civil Service College was constituted as a statutory board under the Public Service Division. The change provided the institution with greater operational autonomy, including greater flexibility in engaging trainers and organising its programmes. It also moved towards a self-funded model in which government ministries and agencies paid for training provided by the college.

== Organisation and structure ==
The Civil Service College serves as a central learning and development institution for the Singapore Public Service. Its stated mission is to "develop people for a first-class Public Service", while its vision is to be the "heart of learning excellence and development for the Singapore Public Service".

Programmes offered by the college range from general professional development and specialised courses, to leadership programmes for different levels of management within the public service. In 2025, the college organised about 362 programmes for more than 53,000 public officers, including over 1,800 international participants. It also maintains partnerships with 47 institutions in more than 19 countries, including those in ASEAN, China, Egypt, Jordan, Kazakhstan, Oman, Qatar, Saudi Arabia, South Africa, South Korea, and Sri Lanka.

The college comprises five institutions:

- Institute of Governance and Policy (IGP)
- Institute of Leadership and Organisation Development (ILOD)
- Institute of Public Administration and Management (IPAM)
- Institute of Public Sector Leadership (IPSL)
- Civil Service College International (CSCI)
