= Stock Exchange of Singapore =

National Stock Exchange of Singapore

The Stock Exchange of Singapore (SES) was a stock exchange company in Singapore. It was formed in 1973, when the termination of currency interchangeability between Malaysia and Singapore, caused the Stock Exchange of Malaysia and Singapore (SEMS) to separate into the SES and Kuala Lumpur Stock Exchange Bhd (KLSEB).

On 1 December 1999, it merged with the Singapore International Monetary Exchange (SIMEX) and the Securities Clearing and Computer Services Pte Ltd (SCCS) to form the Singapore Exchange (SGX).

== See also ==
- Singapore Exchange (SGX)
- List of stock exchanges in the Commonwealth of Nations
