= Senior Cambridge =

Educational qualification

The Senior Cambridge examinations were General Certificate of Education examinations held in India, Jamaica, Malaysia, Pakistan, and Singapore. They were preceded by the Junior Cambridge and Preliminary Cambridge examinations.

== History ==
=== India ===
The first school in Delhi to offer the Senior Cambridge examination was the Cambridge School at Daryaganj. After 1972, the Senior Cambridge examinations were largely superseded by the Indian Certificate of Secondary Education (ICSE) and the Indian School Certificate (ISC) examinations conducted by the Council for the Indian School Certificate Examinations (CISCE), an autonomous body established in 1958.

=== Malaysia ===
During the Japanese occupation of Malaysia in World War II, pupils who sat their Senior Cambridge examinations at some schools in 1941 had to wait until 1946 to learn their results. It was replaced with the Sijil Tinggi Persekolahan Malaysia during the late 1970s.

=== Pakistan ===
At its independence from British India in 1947, Pakistan inherited a number of schools that offered Senior Cambridge examinations. But one of the first schools to offer Senior Cambridge was Cathedral School Hall Road Lahore. Since then, the number of schools with a Senior Cambridge curriculum expanded greatly, and Cambridge schools are prominent among the premier educational institutions of Pakistan.

=== Singapore ===
Prior to the introduction of the O Levels examinations by UCLES, students sat for the Senior Cambridge examinations at the end of their four-year secondary school studies. This is equivalent to the General Certificate of Secondary Education (or GCSE) in England. The Higher School Certificate (HSC) examinations were replaced by A Levels (roughly equivalent to the present British "sixth form") in 1973.

== Subjects ==
=== Textbooks ===
At the Victoria Institution in 1933, the following list of school textbooks was issued to pupils preparing to study for the Senior Cambridge examinations:

- New School Arithmetic
- Algebra, Baker and Bourne
- Geometry Parts I - VI
- Logarithm Tables
- English Exercises, Henry Watson Fowler
- Expansion of the British Empire
- Historical Atlas
- Essentials of World Geography
- Geography
- General Course in Hygiene
- Contouring and Map-Reading, Bertie Cotterell Wallis
- St Matthew
- King's I
- She Stoops to Conquer, Goldsmith
- Essay on Sir William Temple, Thomas Babington Macaulay, 1st Baron Macaulay
- "Q" Poison Island

== See also ==
- Cambridge International Examinations
