= Pingat Pentadbiran Awam =

Pingat Pentadbiran Awam (Public Administration Medal)
- Ribbon after 1996
- Type: Medal
- Awarded for: Outstanding efficiency, competence and industry
- Presented by: Singapore
- Eligibility: Any person employed by, or associated with, government service
- Status: Active
- Established: 1963
- Ribbon prior to 1996

Precedence
- Next (higher): Bintang Bakti Masyarakat (higher than gold, silver and bronze); Pingat Keberanian (higher than silver and bronze only)
- Equivalent: Pingat Pentadbiran Awam (Tentera)
- Next (lower): Pingat Keberanian (lower than gold only); Pingat Kepujian (lower than gold, silver and bronze)

The Pingat Pentadbiran Awam (English: Public Administration Medal) is a Singaporean decoration instituted in 1963 and has three grades:

- Emas (Gold)
- Perak (Silver)
- Gangsa (Bronze)

The medal may be awarded to any of the following persons for outstanding efficiency, competence and industry:

- any person who is or has been a public officer.
- any person who is or has been an officer employed by any statutory authority (other than a Town Council).
- any person who is or has been in the service of any organisation, association or body rendering services in the field of education.
- any person who is or has been employed in any company which is wholly owned by the Government and which is carrying on business mainly as an agent or instrumentality of the Government.

Recipients are entitled to use the post-nominal letters PPA, and may include the grade in brackets - e.g.: PPA(E).

The Pingat Pentadbiran Awam (Tentera) is the Singapore Armed Forces equivalent award.

== Description ==
- The medal consists of 4 integrated and perforated pentagons having, on the obverse side, a four-pointed star upon which is a shield bearing a crescent and 5 stars. Below the shield is a scroll bearing the inscription "PINGAT PENTADBIRAN AWAM".
- The reverse bears the State Arms.
- The ribbon consists of a red centre band flanked immediately on each side by a white stripe, followed by a grey stripe with a thin red stripe in the centre, then a white band, a thin grey stripe, a thin red stripe and finally, a grey band, in that order.
