= Singapore Civil Service =

Permanent bureaucracy of the Singaporean state

The Singapore Civil Service, officially the Public Service Division (PSD), is the bureaucracy of civil servants that supports the Government of Singapore. Along with the Singapore Armed Forces (SAF), statutory boards, and other independent government bodies, the civil service makes up the overall Singapore Public Service. As of 2025, the civil service has about 89,000 employees.

== Overview ==
The civil service was inherited from the British Empire. Since Singapore's independence in 1965, the Civil Service has been closely tied with the governing People's Action Party.

The highest-ranking civil servant within a ministry is known as the permanent secretary. Permanent secretaries in each ministry used to be permanent in their postings. The current practice is to rotate them in various ministries every few years.

== Scholarships ==
Through the Public Service Commission (PSC), the civil service aims to competitively recruit young Singaporeans for future senior state leadership positions via the PSC Scholarship. The scholarship is a contractual agreement between a student, typically a prospective undergraduate, and the PSC that mandates the scholar to work for the government for four to six years after graduation in exchange for their university expenses being paid for. Many scholars choose to remain within the service after their mandatory service period, going on to serve in both senior administrative and political positions as members of the People's Action Party.

Members of the senior civil service have historically been dominated by scholarship recipients, with about 90% of administrative service officers having been scholars as of 2022.

== Leadership ==
=== Head of the Civil Service ===
The highest-ranking civil servant in Singapore is the Head of the Civil Service. The incumbent Head of the Civil Service is Chan Heng Kee, who took office on 1 April 2026. He also holds the position of Permanent Secretary at the Strategy Group. He was the previous Permanent Secretary (Defence) at MINDEF and Permanent Secretary (PMO) (Special Duties).

=== Civil Service Minister ===
Chan Chun Sing has been Minister-in-Charge of the Public Service since 1 May 2018. On 23 May 2025, he was appointed Minister of Defence and Coordinating Minister for Public Services.

== Salaries ==
The salary of civil servants is organised into grades, with employees also being entitled to bonuses. The salary of Members of Parliament (MPs), Cabinet ministers, judges, the attorney-general, speaker, and auditor general are also based upon this scale. Salary grades generally begin with one or two letters, and end with a corresponding number. The top civil service grades are grades 1 to 4, upon which ministerial salary is also pegged.

Civil servants comprise four divisions: I (administrative and professional); II (management executives (MX)); III (Technical Support Scheme, Corporate Support Scheme, and Management Support Scheme); and IV (the Operations Support Scheme (OSS): manual workers and other unskilled labour). Division I employees are divided into Staff, Superscale and Timescale grades, in order of seniority, with superscale employees consisting of permanent secretaries and directors as well as their deputies. In 2017, the formal divisional categories were abolished.

For most civil servants, the pay scale consists of ranges rather than specific fixed salaries, and the actual salaries of civil servants can vary widely depending on performance and other factors. The government's official policy is to keep public and political office salaries in line with industry standards. MR4 grade is pegged to the top income earners in Singapore, specifically accountants, bankers, engineers, lawyers, and senior leadership of local manufacturers and multi-national corporations.

The government last conducted a review of political officeholder salaries in 2017, where it rejected the suggestions of an independent committee to increase the salary ranges, instead opting to keep the ranges as they were in 2011. In the 2011 review of governmental salaries, the government excluded public servants from their final report, instead keeping the salary bands of civil servants at the same level as the 2007 report. Member of Parliament Denise Phua noted that with the exclusion of the administrative service (the highest level of leadership in the civil service) from the review, it is possible that some civil servants earn more than their Ministers. The government was due to review the salaries of political office holders in 2023, but has deferred doing so in light of global economic uncertainty. In 2022, the government increased the salaries of top public servants by 5 to 12% from the 2007 report.

As of the 8 September 2026 revision of the ministerial salaries, the payout have also been increased, with $259,000 at lowest for a regular MP up to the $3.6 million for a Prime Minister. The payout change will be enacted on 15 October. The payout are as follows:

Senior Leadership Pay Grades
Division I Grade	Salary point	Position (general services)	Position (departmental services, statutory boards)	Political appointments	Annual political office salary (approx., SGD; last revised 2026)	Annual political office salary (approx., SGD; last revised 2017)	Annual civil service salary (approx., SGD; as of 2007/2008)	Ref
1 (MR1)	Staff grade IV, V	Very senior permanent secretary	Director	Prime Minister, Senior Minister, Minister Mentor	3,600,000	2,200,000	3,043,300 – 3,760,000	
1 (MR1)	Staff grade IV, V	Very senior permanent secretary	Director	Deputy Prime Minister	3,060,000	1,870,000	2,452,500	
1 (MR1)	Staff grade IV, V	Very senior permanent secretary	Director	Cabinet Minister	2,880,000	1,760,000		
2 (MR2)	Staff grade III	Very senior permanent secretary	Director	President	2,520,000	1,540,000		
2 (MR2)	Staff grade III	Very senior permanent secretary	Director	Cabinet Minister	2,340,000	1,540,000		
3 (MR3)	Staff grade II	Very senior permanent secretary	Director	Cabinet Minister	2,340,000	1,320,000		
D4 (MR4)	DStaff grade I	DSenior permanent secretary	DDirector	Cabinet Minister	1,800,000	1,100,000	1,593,500 – 1,940,000	
D4 (MR4)	DStaff grade I	DSenior permanent secretary	DDirector	Speaker	900,000	550,000	796,500 – 970,000	
5 (SR5)	Superscale B	Permanent secretary	Director	Senior Minister of State	1,530,000	935,000		
6 (SR6)	Superscale C	Permanent secretary	Director	Minister of State	1,530,000	770,000		
7 (SR7)	Superscale D	Deputy secretary	Deputy director, superintendent	Senior Parliamentary Secretary	810,000	572,000		
8 (SR8)	Superscale E	Deputy secretary	Deputy director, superintendent	Parliamentary Secretary	810,000	418,000		
9 (SR9)	Superscale G	Deputy secretary	Deputy director, superintendent	Member of Parliament	259,000	200,000 – 260,000 (as of 2022)	384,000 – 398,000	

MX Pay Grades
Grade	Monthly salary (approx., SGD)	Ref
MX10	7,000 – 11,500 (as of 2015)	
MX11	4,700 – 8,600 (as of 2015)	
MX12	2,400 – 5,900 (as of 2015)	
MX13	3,100	
MX14	1,811 (as of 2019)	
MX15	1,614 (as of 2019)	
MX16	1,252 (as of 2019)	

Nursing Pay Grades (2012)
Grade	Monthly salary (approx., SGD)
Advanced Practice Nurse	5,100 – 8,800
Nursing Officer I	4,400 – 7,500
Nursing Officer II	3,500 – 6,000
Senior Staff Nurse I	3,000 – 5,100
Senior Staff Nurse II	2,600 – 4,600
Staff Nurse I	2,150 – 3,750
Staff Nurse II	1,800 – 3,100
Principal Enrolled Nurse I	2,250 – 3,750
Senior Enrolled Nurse I	2,000 – 3,450
Senior Enrolled Nurse II	1,700 – 3,000
Enrolled Nurse I	1,550 – 2,600
Enrolled Nurse II	1,350 – 2,250

Technical Support Scheme Pay Grades (2015)
Grade	Example occupation	Monthly salary (approx., SGD)
I	Chief Technical Executive	5,900 – 7,700
II	Senior Principal Technical Executive	4,850 – 6,600
III	Principal Technical Executive	3,700 – 5,700
IV	Senior Technical Executive	3,000 – 4,800
V	Technical Executive	2,700 – 4,200
VI	Admin Secretary	1,900 – 3,300
VII	Technician	2,000 – 3,000
VIII	Technician	1,200 – 2,700

Operation Support Scheme Pay Grades (2013)
Grade	Monthly salary (approx., SGD)	Ref
I	1,700 – 2,200	
II	1,600 – 2,000	
III	1,500 – 1,800	
IV	1,400 – 1,700	
V	1,200 – 1,400	

The salaries of political appointments, such as the MPs and the speaker of Parliament, are ratios of the MR4 salary. While new ministers salaries start off at the MR4 grade, the prime minister may increase a minister's pay grade at his discretion. While the salaries of political leaders are generally fixed upon the pay grades, the salaries of civil servants may vary greatly. For example, the MR4 discount of being only 60% of the median top salary is done only for ministers, "to reflect the ethos of sacrifice that political service involves", and does not apply to civil servants.

The salary of the Chief Justice of Singapore is currently not disclosed to the public. In previous government documents, it had been pegged at Staff Grade II, Staff Grade IV, and above Staff Grade IV. Legal service officers have been previously pegged to judicial salaries and those of private practice lawyers.

== Assessment ==
Thomas Friedman of The New York Times considers the Singapore Civil Service to be one of the most efficient and uncorrupt bureaucracies in the world, with a high standard of discipline and accountability.

According to state officials, Confucian values and meritocratic principles shape the nation's public administration, with the government promoting a culture that reveres education, discipline, and respect for authority. Former Prime Minister Lee Kuan Yew argued that these values have allowed individuals from modest backgrounds to rise to leadership positions; helped build an efficient, corruption‑free bureaucracy; and upheld public trust in government institutions. It is also considered a key contributor to the success of Singapore since its independence from Malaysia.

Non-state commentators have argued that the persisting dominance of the People's Action Party (PAP) on the civil service has led to complacency and groupthink, with the supporting ministries being resistant to alternative views and fundamentally unprepared for a change of government.

The salaries of high-ranking civil servants in Singapore are some of the highest in the world. This has led to some criticisms towards the government for overpaying its employees or crowding out the private sector and reducing the number of highly talented citizens within the private sector. In response, the government has maintained that a high pay is necessary to prevent corruption, staff attrition, and the influence of outside money in the public service, as well as to attract and retain talent from the private sector.

=== September 2026 ===
In September 2026, the National Bureau of Economic Research (NBER) published a working paper titled Do Social Norms Substitute for Enforcement? Evidence from Public Officials’ Home Purchases in Singapore. The study was authored by researchers Tomasz Piskorski from Columbia University, Amit Seru and Chun Zhao from Stanford University, and Jian Zhang from the University of Hong Kong. The study examined whether civil servants engaged in informed property trading prior to public infrastructure announcements. The researchers found that between 2007 and 2011, civil servants—specifically mid-level officials in agencies linked to rail planning—purchased private residential homes near unannounced MRT stations at significantly higher rates than matched non-civil servant controls, with purchasing activity concentrated one to two years before official announcements. The study estimated 221 purchase incidences across civil servants and their co-registered relatives, representing a total gross transaction value of approximately S$270 million. However, the researchers noted that this elevated buying pattern effectively disappeared after 2011, coinciding with tighter regulatory enforcement such as the 2012 amendments to the Securities and Futures Act.

The Public Service Division (PSD) announced a review of the involved officers' property purchases on 25 September. On 6 October, Minister-in-charge of Public Services Chan Chun Sing informed Parliament that the review scope had been extended through 2014 due to ongoing station announcements post-2011. After reviewing 191 officers' property transactions, the PSD referred eight public officers to the Singapore Police Force for further investigation due to specific transaction circumstances or incomplete records.

== See also ==
- Organisation of the Government of Singapore
- Statutory boards of the Government of Singapore
- Public Service Commission
- President's Scholar
- SAF Scholarship
