= 2023 Singaporean presidential election =

- 1 September 2023
- Registered: 2,709,455 (▲7.66%) (Note: Compared to 2011.)
- Turnout: 93.41% (▼1.39pp)
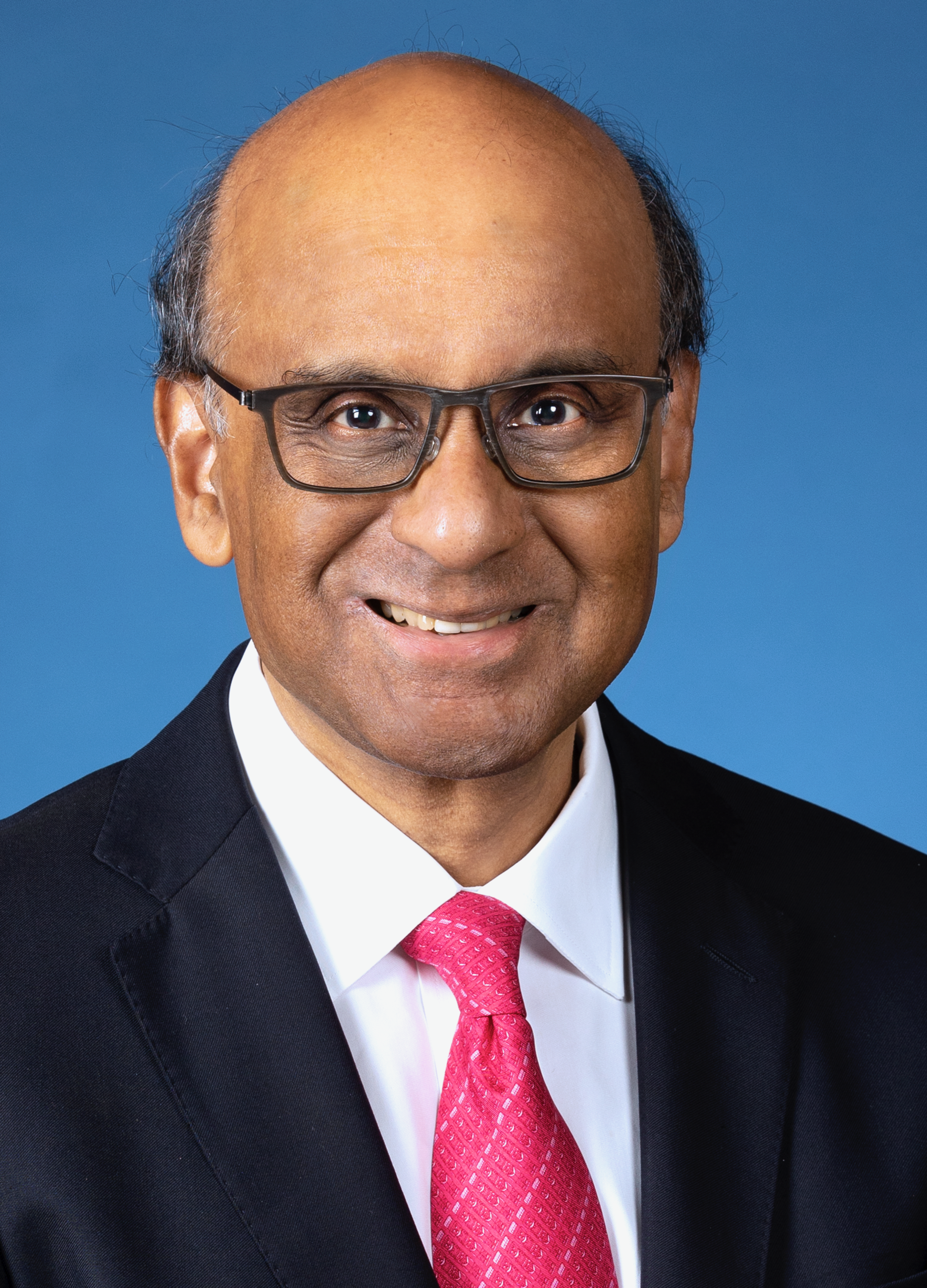

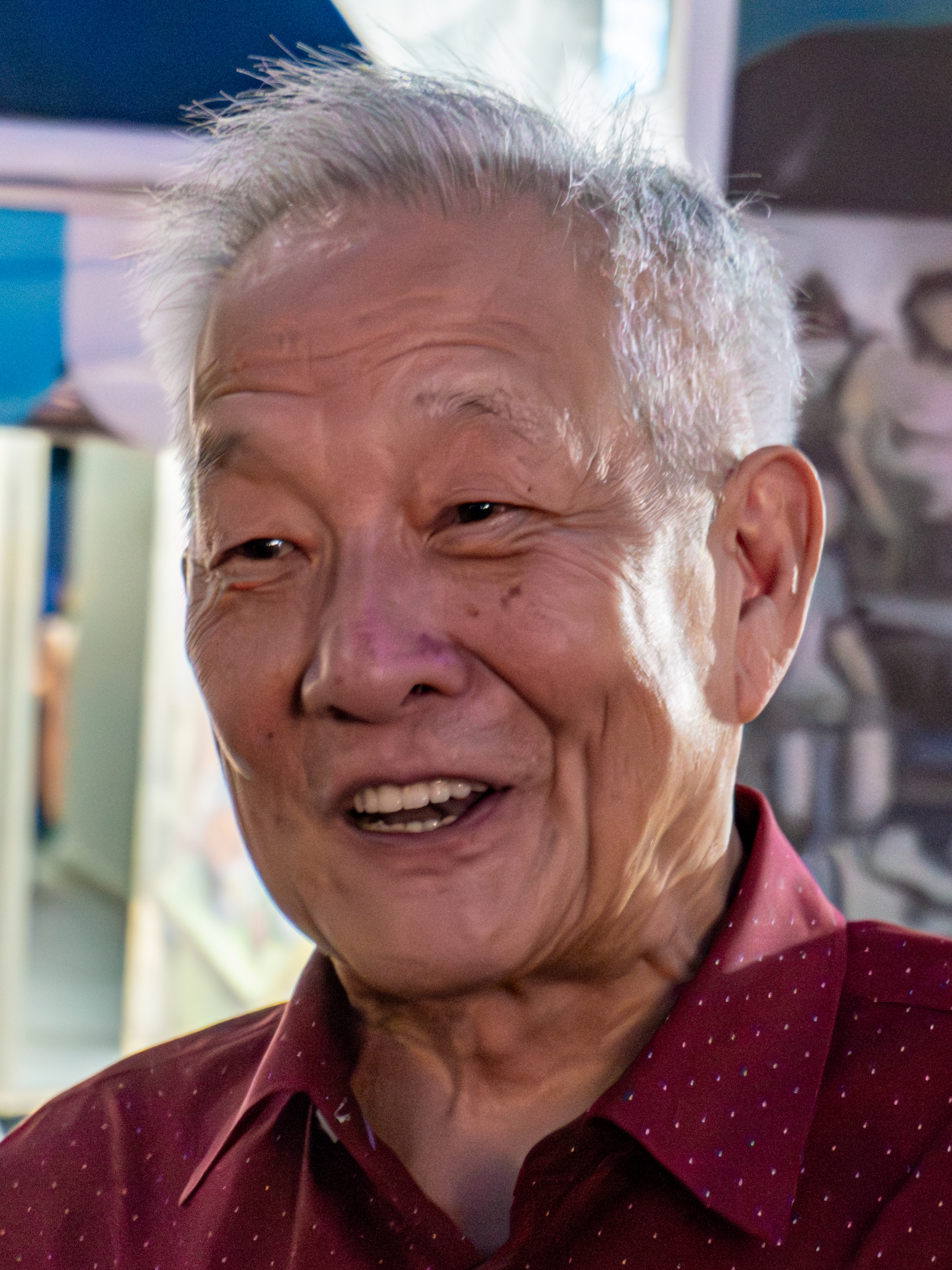

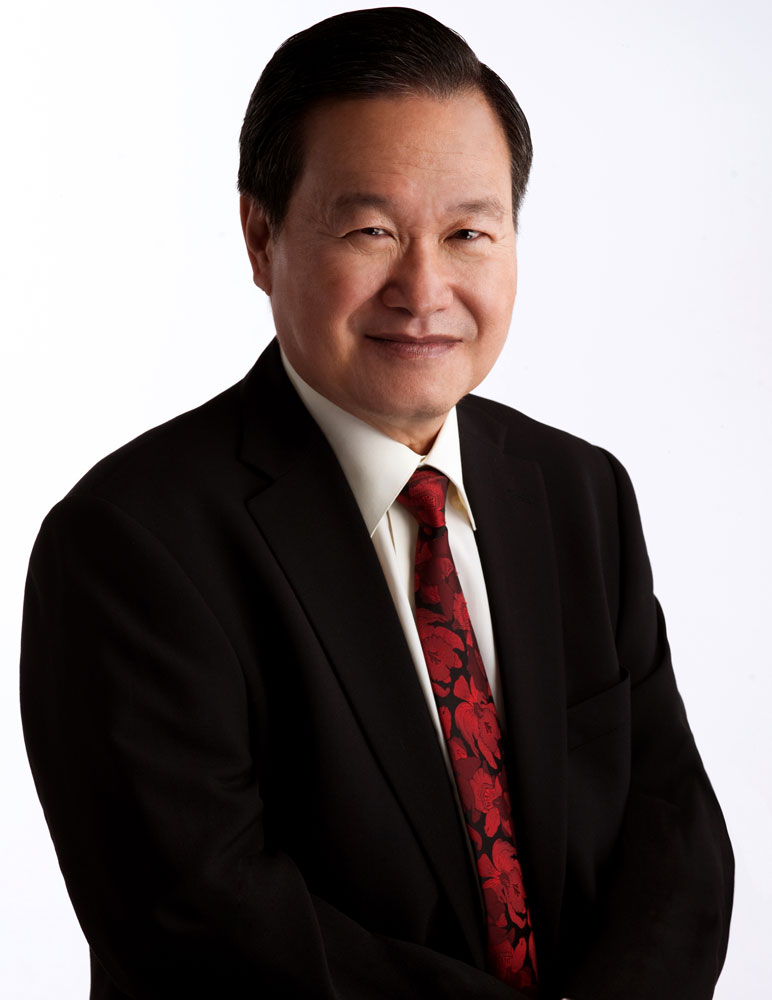
Nominee	Tharman Shanmugaratnam	Ng Kok Song	Tan Kin Lian
Party	Independent	Independent	Independent
Popular vote	1,749,261	390,636	344,584
Percentage	70.41%	15.72%	13.87%
President before election
Halimah Yacob
Independent
Elected President
Tharman Shanmugaratnam
Independent

Presidential elections were held in Singapore on 1 September 2023. It was the sixth direct presidential election and the third to be contested by more than one candidate. Incumbent president Halimah Yacob, who had been elected unopposed in 2017, did not seek re-election.

Three candidates contested the non-partisan position: Tharman Shanmugaratnam, Ng Kok Song and Tan Kin Lian. All were independents or had resigned from any political parties they were previously members of. Each candidate was issued a Certificate of Eligibility (COE) and a community certificate, meeting the eligibility requirements to contest in the election.

Tharman won a majority of the votes, at 70.41% of the votes and winning by a record margin. He also became the first non-Chinese candidate to be directly elected to the presidency. Ng received 15.72% of the vote, while two-time presidential candidate Tan received 13.87%, improving on his performance in the 2011 election when he had performed poorly enough to forfeit his election deposit. Tharman was inaugurated on 14 September as the ninth president of Singapore.

== Background ==
The president of Singapore is the head of state of Singapore, is paid an annual salary of S$1.54 million, or US$1.1 million, and is subject to periodic White Paper reviews. The previous president was Halimah Yacob, who took office on 14 September 2017. She was the first female president in the country's history.

=== Eligibility ===
Candidates must satisfy either the public sector or private sector requirement. Under the public sector requirement, the candidate automatically qualifies if having held either a designated public office or the chief executive position of a key statutory board or government company. Under the private sector requirement, the candidate automatically qualifies if that person has been the chief executive of a company with S$500 million shareholders' equity and net profitability. Notwithstanding the aforementioned automatic tracks, candidates could also be qualified on a deliberative track where their abilities and experiences have been assessed by the Presidential Elections Committee (PEC) to be equivalent to either the public- or private-sector automatic track requirements.

The presidency is required by the Constitution to be non-partisan. However, many former presidents, as well as former candidates, had ties with the long-ruling People's Action Party (PAP) prior to their candidacies. Tharman had served as an MP for the PAP. He was a cabinet member from 2001 to 2023, and was once seen as a potential candidate for prime minister. Tharman was also described by the Reuters news agency as the candidate closest to the country's establishment.

Ng had previous work experience with Singapore's sovereign wealth fund, the GIC, as well as the country's monetary authority. Tan had previous ties with the arm of the National Trades Union Congress that is now known as Income Insurance. Tan's candidacy also had the support of a number of opposition figures, including SDP's Tan Jee Say and Lim Tean with the Peoples Voice party as proposers, a mid-race endorsement from former presidential candidate and then PSP chairman Tan Cheng Bock (albeit in a personal capacity), as well as support from SDP's Chee Soon Juan and PPP's Goh Meng Seng.

Following amendments to the Constitution, the 2017 presidential election was the first to be reserved for a particular racial community. (Note: In Singapore, its citizens are organised under the CMIO (Chinese–Malay–Indian–Other) system of categorisation.) It was restricted to candidates from the minority Malay community, who had not held the presidency since 1970. The 2023 presidential election was open to candidates of any racial community.

=== Election procedures ===
President Halimah Yacob's term of office was scheduled to end on 13 September 2023. The presidential election had to be held within three months of that date. Any Singaporean citizen who wished to be a candidate in the election had to apply and receive a Certificate of Eligibility (COE), as well as a community certificate.

On 11 August, the writ of election was issued by Prime Minister Lee Hsien Loong. The writ specified Nomination Day to be held on 22 August 2023 at the People's Association (PA) headquarters at 9 King George's Avenue. The Returning Officer for this election was to be Tan Meng Dui, CEO of the Housing and Development Board (HDB), who is serving his second term, after the 2020 general election.

By Nomination Day, all prospective candidates had to have prepared their nomination papers, which included the COE, community certificate, and political donation certificate. The candidate also had to pay the election deposit of $40,500, which was lowered from the $43,500 required for the previous election. A candidate would lose this deposit if they did not receive 12.50% of the total votes cast. The nomination paper must be signed by one's proposer, seconder, and at least four assenters, and be handed to the Returning Officer between 11:00 to 12:00 SST (UTC+08:00) on Nomination Day. On that day, the Returning Officer announces the candidates running for the presidency. However, if only one candidate was successfully nominated, the election would be declared a walkover, and the sole nominated candidate would be the President-elect. Otherwise, Polling Day was set for 1 September.

In-person rallies were discouraged by the Elections Department, which did not designate any rally sites, as such rallies may be divisive and thus not congruent with the nature of the unifying nature of the presidential system. Candidate speeches were televised on local television channels instead, while smaller election meetings were allowed to be held, albeit indoors or otherwise under cover, for security reasons. Campaigning took place between 22 and 30 August. This was followed by a cooling-off day, on 31 August, on the eve of Polling Day, when campaigning was prohibited, to allow time for voters to reflect on events before casting their votes.

Under the first-past-the-post voting system used in Singapore, the candidate with a plurality of votes is elected as president.

=== Local voting ===
Polling Day was 1 September 2023, between 08:00 and 20:00; the winner of the election was determined by first-past-the-post voting (FPTP) and was inaugurated on 14 September. The election would potentially see 2,709,455 eligible voters cast their votes, up from 2,653,942 from the most recent general election in 2020, and 2,274,773 from the last contested presidential election in 2011; in turn, this was the first election where voters born after the 3rd millennium (born before 31 July 2002) were eligible. The Elections Department of Singapore (ELD) increased the number of polling stations from 1,097 to 1,264, reducing the number of voters allocated to each station from an average of 2,400 to 2,150, compared to the last election. The ELD had also assigned more civil servants, increasing them from 30,000 to 36,000. The 'X' pen used in the 2020 general election was also replaced with an 'X' stamp, to eliminate the confusion of voters who in the previous election had mistaken the pen for writing rather than for marking. After the polls closed, ballot boxes were sealed and transported to one of 215 counting stations.

On 24 August, ELD issued an apology to 9,822 voters from Tanjong Pagar GRC—all of whom had been assigned to vote at either St Margaret's School, Tanglin Community Centre, Farrer Park Primary School, or Delta Sports Hall—for a printing mishap whereby duplicate poll cards with different serial numbers had been mistakenly printed and sent to voters. ELD also announced that about 200 voters would be excluded from the voting list, citing scanning issues on some NRIC cards during the 2020 general election, that number later being increased to 1,093, and that 32,807 non-voters had since been reinstated onto the voter list when restorations began on 5 October 2020;

With the amendments to a bill of 8 March 2023, mobile polling stations were, for the first time, set up at 31 selected nursing homes to cater to the elderly. This was in response to an ageing electorate and travel restrictions, especially with regard to the COVID-19 pandemic occurring at the time of the 2020 elections, according to Education Minister and Minister-in-charge of the Public Service Chan Chun Sing. For this election, there would be 4,807 nursing home residents voting at these stations. This would be the only time mobile stations were set for the election, as it would be discontinued in future elections, citing mixed responses and logistics difficulties.

During the opening hours of Polling Day, there were technical issues with the e-registration system, leading to a buildup of queues at the various polling stations. The technical issues were resolved. When Parliament convened on 18 September, Chan addressed these issues to ensure a prevention of similar incidents in the future.

Under constitutionally-required compulsory voting, non-voters would be delisted from the Registers of Electors and, for the first time ever, were notified of such via mail and the SingPass app. The list of non-voters was compiled and published on 9 November, with inspections and registrations for reinstating starting the day after.

=== Overseas voting ===
In 2023, an amendment to the Presidential Elections Act and Parliamentary Elections Act was tabled in Parliament; it enabled Singaporeans living abroad to vote by post in subsequent elections, giving them an additional option. This was the first election whereby Singaporean citizens abroad could exercise their voting rights by post. Prior to 2023, they may only vote in person at one of ten designated overseas polling stations, located in various places such as Australia (Canberra), China (three polling stations: Beijing, Hong Kong and Shanghai), Japan (Tokyo), the United Arab Emirates (Dubai), the United Kingdom (London), and the United States (three polling stations: New York City, San Francisco, and Washington, D.C.). Expatriate citizens were also assigned a polling station in Singapore, where they could vote in person if they happened to be in Singapore on polling day.

On 23 August, ELD confirmed that 6,649 voters had been registered as overseas voters, with 3,432 doing postal voting and the rest being assigned to their respective overseas polling stations. During Polling Day, ELD advised overseas voters in Hong Kong to follow the latest safety updates about the approaching Typhoon Saola before heading outdoors to vote, but its voting station opened as usual. In Japan, another country with an overseas polling station, had reported its highest average temperature during the voting hours, amidst the ongoing heat wave.

== Candidates ==
The Elections Department (ELD) announced that there were 6 Certificate of Eligibility applications, three of which (two Chinese and one Indian/other minority) were accepted. ELD also announced that there were 16 Community Certificate applications, six of which (five Chinese and one Indian/other minority) were accepted.

=== Eligible ===
Candidates	Background	Application result
Tharman Shanmugaratnam	Tharman has served as Senior Minister, Coordinating Minister for Social Policies, chairman of the Monetary Authority of Singapore, deputy chairman of GIC, chairman of the International Advisory Council of the Economic Development Board, and from 2001 to 2023 a member of parliament for Jurong GRC's Taman Jurong division. On 8 June, Tharman announced that, to run for the presidency, he would resign from all his positions in the government and as a member of the governing People's Action Party (PAP) on 7 July. On 26 July, at a press conference at the York Hotel, Tharman launched his campaign and announced his team of assenters. On 7 August, he submitted his application for a certificate of eligibility to the Elections Department.	Application for Certificate of Eligibility accepted.
Ng Kok Song	Ng is the founding partner and chairman of Avanda Investment Management and former GIC chief investment officer. He is serving on the advisory board of PIMCO, has served on the governing board of Lee Kuan Yew School of Public Policy, and was the founding chairman of the Singapore International Monetary Exchange (SIMEX), which was later merged to form the Singapore Exchange (SGX). On 19 July, he collected his application forms and announced his bid to run for the presidency. On 2 August, Ng submitted his application for a certificate of eligibility to the Elections Department and announced that George Yeo would be one of his character references. At the time of nomination, Ng was the only candidate without any record of participating in any political party, and the third overall presidential candidate to be so unaffiliated, after Chua Kim Yeow and S.R. Nathan.	Application for Certificate of Eligibility accepted.
Tan Kin Lian	Tan is a former CEO of NTUC Income (1997–2007) and former branch secretary at Marine Parade GRC of the governing People's Action Party (PAP) for three years. He eventually left the PAP in 2008 after three decades of membership, due to his inactivity and disagreements with the party's values. Tan contested the 2011 presidential election but finished last by a large margin in a four-cornered contest and consequently forfeited his electoral deposit. On 31 July, Tan announced that he had submitted his application for a certificate of eligibility to the Elections Department (ELD) on 11 July. He added that he would wait for the Presidential Elections Committee (PEC) to announce the final slate of approved candidates before deciding whether to submit his nomination paper. On 11 August, Tan launched his campaign, with Tan Jee Say and Lim Tean on his team of assenters. On 17 August, Tan announced he would not submit his nomination forms if all four prospective candidates were eligible to run for the election, and that it was his plan the whole time.	Application for Certificate of Eligibility accepted.

=== Declared ineligible ===
Candidates	Background	Application result
George Goh Ching Wah	On 12 June, Goh, the co-founder of Harvey Norman Ossia, confirmed that he would be running for president. He had previously been the non-resident Ambassador to Morocco, and is also the co-founder of the charity Border Mission. According to Goh, all the companies he owns or runs have a collective market capitalisation value of S$3.15 billion. On 4 August, Goh submitted his application for a certificate of eligibility to the Elections Department. Goh's application was unsuccessful, and he was not certified. Goh later said he did not accept the committee's reason for denying him the certificate, saying they took a narrow view of his capabilities. In a letter made public, the committee said that the five companies were considered on their individual merits and could not be aggregated, thus not meeting the S$500 million shareholder equity requirement.	Application for Certificate of Eligibility rejected.

=== Publicly expressed interest ===
Candidates	Background
Lee Hsien Yang	Lee spent most of his career in the private sector, including being the CEO of Singtel and Chairman of the Civil Aviation Authority of Singapore (CAAS). A prominent member of the Lee family, he is the youngest son of founding Prime Minister Lee Kuan Yew and brother of current Prime Minister Lee Hsien Loong. Lee is estranged from his brother over the 38 Oxley Road dispute and had endorsed the Progress Singapore Party in the 2020 general election. During a telephone interview with Bloomberg in March 2023, Lee said, "There is a view that depending on who they (the People's Action Party) float, if I were to run they would be in serious trouble and could lose. A lot of people have come to me. They really want me to run. It's something I would consider." As of March 2023, both Lee and his wife, Lee Suet Fern, were in self-imposed exile in the United Kingdom after facing investigation for lying during judicial proceedings. He did not collect his application forms from the Elections Department.
Seng Soon Kia	Seng is a 72-year-old former woodworking teacher who collected his application forms at the Elections Department office on 13 June 2023. In an interview conducted by the media following the collection of his application forms, he claimed to have fulfilled the requirements to run as president.
Turritopsis Dohrnii Teo En Ming	Teo is a 45-year-old information technology consultant who collected his application forms at the Elections Department office on 27 June 2023; he announced his presidential bid on TikTok. He expressed his admiration for Sun Yat-sen and Ong Teng Cheong, the fifth President of Singapore, and stated that he wished to be a "President for all" like them.

=== Declined to be candidates ===
Candidates	Background
Halimah Yacob	The eighth, and incumbent, president of Singapore, announced on 29 May 2023 that she would not be seeking re-election after "careful consideration".
George Yeo	Minister for Foreign Affairs from 2004 to 2011 and Member of Parliament for Aljunied GRC from 1988 to 2004, ruled out a run for president after his defeat for a seat from Aljunied GRC during the 2011 general election. In 2022, he confirmed he would not run in the 2023 presidential election.

== Endorsements ==
The candidates received the following endorsements:

=== Tharman Shanmugaratnam ===
- Kishore Mahbubani, diplomat, former Singapore Permanent Representative to the United Nations
- Lee Hsien Loong, Prime Minister of Singapore and Secretary-General of the People's Action Party (PAP) (Note: Endorsement made in June shortly after Tharman announced his resignations from his ministerial positions and as a member of the PAP to run in the presidential election.)
- Tommy Koh, diplomat, Singapore ambassador-at-large and former Permanent Representative to the United Nations

=== Ng Kok Song ===
- George Yeo, former cabinet minister and former chief of staff of the Republic of Singapore Air Force (RSAF)

=== Tan Kin Lian ===
- Chee Soon Juan, perennial political candidate and secretary general of the Singapore Democratic Party (SDP) (Note: Although Chee had endorsed Tan, he noted some reservations as well as his disagreements with Tan's views particularly on his comments on women and opposition politics.)
- Goh Meng Seng, founder and secretary general of the People's Power Party (PPP)
- Iris Koh, anti-vaccination activist
- Lim Tean, founder and secretary general of the Peoples Voice (PV)
- Tan Cheng Bock, former presidential candidate in 2011 and founder of the Progress Singapore Party (PSP)
- Tan Jee Say, former presidential candidate, in 2011, and former secretary general of the now-defunct Singaporeans First (SingFirst) party

== Timeline ==
=== Table of significant events ===
All dates are according to Singapore Standard Time (SST), which is UTC+08:00.

Date	Event
May 2023
29 May	Incumbent President Halimah Yacob announces that she will not run for re-election in 2023.
June 2023
8 June	Senior Minister Tharman Shanmugaratnam puts himself forward as a presidential candidate, and announces that he will step down from all political positions on 7 July.
12 June	Harvey Norman Ossia chairman George Goh declares his intention to run for the presidency.
13 June	Applications for certificates of eligibility (COE) and community certificates were made available. Two potential candidates, George Goh and Seng Soon Kia, collect their application forms at the Elections Department.
27 June	Teo En Ming collects his application forms at the Elections Department.
July 2023
19 July	Ng Kok Song collects his application forms at the Elections Department.
26 July	Tharman Shanmugaratnam launches his presidential campaign, titled "Respect for All".
30 July	Tan Kin Lian reveals that he has submitted his application forms for the Certificate of Eligibility.
August 2023
2 August	Ng Kok Song submits application forms for the Certificate of Eligibility.
4 August	George Goh submits application forms for the Certificate of Eligibility. He also launched his presidential campaign that afternoon.
7 August	Tharman Shanmugaratnam submits application forms for the Certificate of Eligibility.
11 August	Tan Kin Lian announces his official bid for the presidency, his second attempt since the 2011 election.
11 August	Issuance of Writ of Election, adjourning Nomination Day and Polling Day on 22 August and 1 September, respectively.
17 August	Deadline for applications for the Certificate of Eligibility and Community Certificate.
18 August	Tharman Shanmugaratnam, Ng Kok Song, and Tan Kin Lian were issued certificates of eligibility. ELD also announced that 10 out of the 16 community declarations and three applications for COE, most notably of George Goh, were rejected.
22 August	Nomination Day (see below); All three eligible candidates (Ng Kok Song, Tharman Shanmugaratnam, and Tan Kin Lian) were nominated and a notice of contested election was issued.
22 to 30 August	Campaigning period (see below)
31 August	Cooling-off Day
September 2023
1 September	Polling Day (see below)
2 September	At 00:23, Returning Officer Tan Meng Dui announced outcome of election. (see below)
12 September	Overseas vote counting
13 September	Halimah Yacob's term of office expires.
14 September	Inauguration day (see below)

=== Candidate participation timeline ===
Timelines of candidate announcements and, if applicable, withdrawals are as follows:

Status
Successfully nominated
Running
Expressed interest, yet to run
Withdrawn/Did not qualify
Events
Writ of Election issued
Deadline for Certificate of Eligibility
Nomination Day
Presidential Candidate Broadcast 1
CNA Presidential Forum
Presidential Candidate Broadcast 2
Polling Day
Inauguration Day

== Selection of candidates ==
On 18 August, the Elections Department (ELD) announced the results of the applications for the Certificate of Eligibility (COE) and Community Certificate, one day after the applications for both certificates closed, on 17 August. Three potential candidates were issued both the COE and community declaration:

- Ng Kok Song: due to the prior experience and ability comparable to someone who served as a chief executive officer-equivalent role of a government-based company for at least three years. In Ng's case, he was the chief investment officer of the GIC between 2007 and 2013.
- Tharman Shanmugaratnam: due to serving as a cabinet minister for at least 3 years. Tharman served 20 years as a cabinet minister between 2003 and 2023, including as a Chairman of Monetary Authority of Singapore between 2011 and 2023.
- Tan Kin Lian: due to the prior experience and ability comparable to someone who served as a chief executive officer-equivalent role of a typical company with at least $500 million in shareholder equity. In Tan's case, he served as a chief executive officer of NTUC Income Insurance Cooperative between 1997 and 2007 for around 10 years and accumulated a shareholder's equity of over $1.4 billion during his tenure.

All three candidates had been characterized by ELD as having "integrity, good character and reputation"; both Ng and Tharman had satisfied the public-sector requirements, while Tan had fulfilled the private-sector requirements.

== Nomination Day ==
Nomination Day was held on 22 August 2023 at the People's Association headquarters at 9 King George's Avenue. The three candidates that were awarded the Certificate of Eligibility—Ng Kok Song, Tharman Shanmugaratnam and Tan Kin Lian—were nominated.

=== Candidates' symbols and slogans ===
Following the nominations, the three candidates unveiled their symbols and their slogans, as follows:

Candidate	Description of symbol	Slogan
Ng Kok Song	Hand with a heart shape at its palm	United for our future
Tharman Shanmugaratnam	Pineapple	Respect for all
Tan Kin Lian	Four person living in harmony, holding a flower	Bring back trust, give us hope

According to an interview during his campaign, Tharman also considered a durian as his alternate symbol, but eventually went with a pineapple, as it represents prosperity, and also referenced his prior ministerial roles.

=== Team of Assenters ===
Candidates	Ng Kok Song		Tan Kin Lian		Tharman Shanmugaratnam	
Assenter	Name	Profession	Name	Profession	Name	Profession
Proposer	Quah Wee Ghee	Co-founder of Avanda Investment Management and ex-presidents of GIC public market	Tan Jee Say	Ex-principal private secretary, founder of ex-Singaporeans First party and nominated candidate in 2011	Thomas Chua Kee Seng	President of Singapore Federation of Chinese Clan Associations, honorary president of Singapore Chamber of Commerce and Industry, board chairman of Techwah and ex-NMP
Seconder	Carol Tan	Geriatrician at Good Life Medical Centre	Lim Tean	Founder of People's Voice party	Mohammad Alami Musa	Head of studies of inter-religious relations at NTU, ambassador to Algeria and ex-president of MUIS
Assenter 1	Ameerali Abdeali	Justice of the Peace, director of GetIT Communications, and CEO of Team6Safety Training & Consultancy	Leong Sze Hian	Honorary chairman of Singapore Professional Centre and acting managing director of The Online Citizen	Mary Liew	President of NTUC and ex-NMP
Assenter 2	Ho Tian Yee	Chairman of Fullerton Fund Management, Mount Alvernia Hospital, FFMC Holdings, deputy chairman of Pavilion Capital and director of Seviora Holdings	Yeo Gim Beng	Business owner and director	Lim Siong Guan	Group president of GIC and ex-chairman of IRAS, ACRA, EDB, and CPF
Assenter 3	Chua Cher Choon	Ex-chairman of the Montfort School managing committee and ex-career banker	Manmeet Singh s/o Bahadar Singh	Food delivery driver	Ho Kwon Ping	Founder/executive chairman of Banyan Tree Holdings, executive director of Laguna Resorts & Hotels and Thai Wah
Assenter 4	Mohamed Salleh Marican	CEO of Second Chance and 2017 aspirant	Vigneswari d/o V Ramachan-dran	Pre-school teacher	Kamisinah Sadar	General manager of Tasek Jurong and ex-executive director of Pertapis
Assenter 5	Margaret Chan	Philanthropist and governor emeritus of Lien Foundation	Vincent Tan Hun Cheong	Sales and business development executive	Veera Sekaran	Professor of Biological Sciences at NUS
Assenter 6	Abdul Hamid Abdullah	Founding member of Assoc of Muslim Professionals, Casa Raudha Women Home and ex-audit director of Auditor-General's Office	Chiu Shin Kong	Self employed	Hassan Ahmad	Humanitarian, special advisor to Humanity Matters and ex-CEO of Mercy Relief
Assenter 7	Tjio Hans	CJ Koh distinguished professor of law at NUS, ex-director of Centre for Banking & Finance Law and Centre for Commercial Law Studies	Chen Jun Hao	Undergraduate law student, business owner and freelancer	Kim Whye Kee	Business owner of Qi Pottery, co-founder of Beacon of Life and ex-prison inmate
Assenter 8	Angelene Chan	Chairman of DP Architects	Khuan Jia Hui	Patient clinic associate	Royston Tan	Independent film-maker

== Campaigning period ==
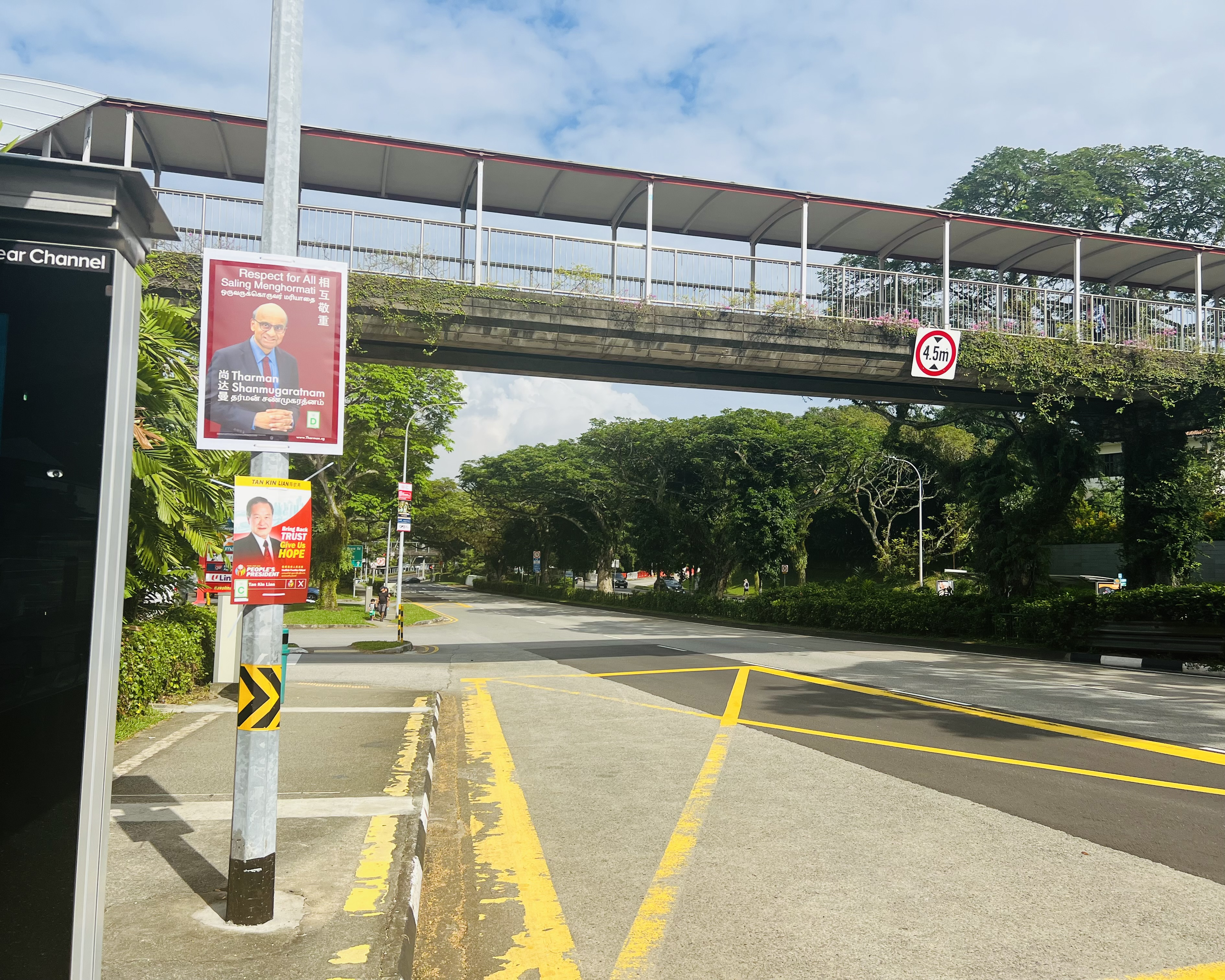
Campaign posters of Tharman Shanmugaratnam and Tan Kin Lian on a light pole along Holland Road

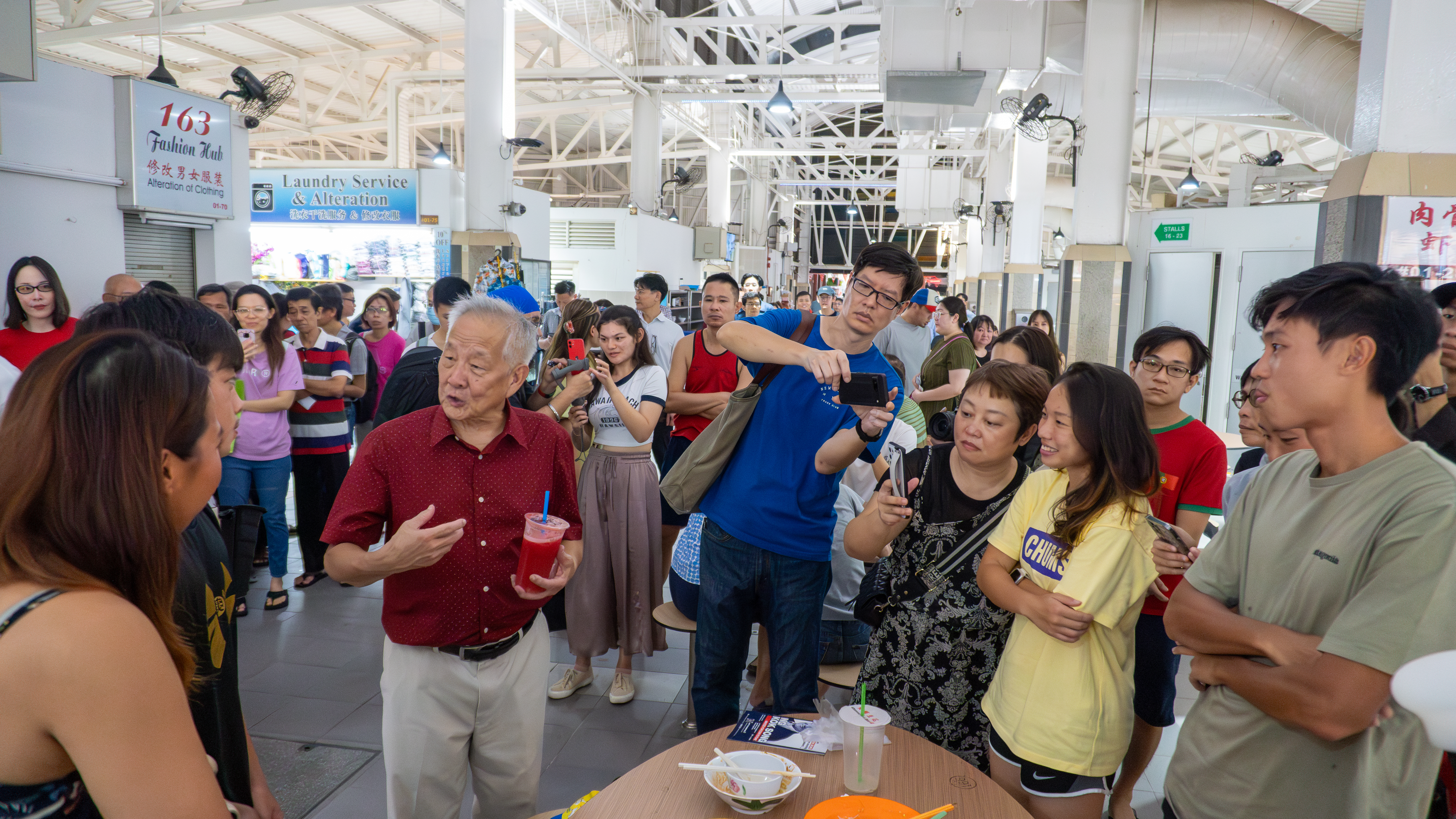
Ng Kok Song abstained from putting up such posters, citing limited resources and sustainability issues and instead relying on social media and walkabouts

Under amendments to bills of 8 March, minors under the age of 16 (previously applied to students studying in primary or secondary schools) and foreign entities (such as companies or organisations) are barred from any political involvement to prevent exploitation, though they can still participate in election-related activities such as attending rallies. Foreign individuals remained barred from involvement under previous laws. The election expenditure limit is capped at either S$600,000 or 30 cents per registered voter, whichever amount is greater. The latter amount was announced on 12 August to be S$812,822.10, higher than the minimum of S$600,000. Candidates must declare their election expenses within 31 days after Polling Day.

=== 22–25 August ===
The candidates gave acceptance speeches on Nomination Day. Ng Kok Song was the first to deliver his speech. He stated that he had never been part of a political party before, and vowed that, if elected, he would protect "three treasures": past reserves, public services, and social stability. Tharman Shanmugaratnam was the second to speak, pledging to have a "fair, dignified and honourable contest", and promised a campaign that "unites Singaporeans and not divide us". Tan Kin Lian was the last to give his speech, and emphasised the need to vote for a president "truly independent" of the government. Tan also claimed that he was the target of a "smear campaign" before the nomination, with regard to his social media posts. However, he later did apologise to those who felt "uncomfortable" with his posts.

Campaign posters were placed immediately following the nominations, with Tharman's posters being put up first, followed by Tan's shortly after. Only Ng abstained from doing so, citing "limited resources" and environmental concerns – instead, he announced that he would rely on social media to spread his campaign message.

Ng began his campaigning by visiting his former residence at Kangkar (now Sengkang and located in Upper Serangoon) where he bowed down and kissed the ground, referencing his childhood and proving that young Singaporeans can be successful regardless of background. Ng also visited several sites at Hougang—such as the Church of the Nativity of the Blessed Virgin Mary, Montfort School, and Kangkar Mall—to distribute pamphlets. On the second day, Ng warned the media that the relationship between the president and the prime minister should not be "too close", as it would then be difficult for the president to discharge their duties objectively. He added that he would schedule an online rally.

On 25 August, Tharman hosted an indoor rally at 24OWLS, which is located within Pasir Panjang Power Station.

=== 25–30 August ===
On the night of 27 August, Tan Kin Lian cancelled the remainder of his walkabouts and interviews, without giving a reason for doing so. On 28 August, several opposition candidates and political analysts began to query Tan's being an "independent candidate" after seeing that he had received support from Tan Cheng Bock and Tan Jee Say on several media outlets, along with a sticker containing a memetic tagline "One Vote, Three presidents?". The sticker was removed as of 30 August, due to its being a violation of the campaigning guidelines under the Presidential Election Act 1991, according to ELD and Tan's team, whose principal election agent, Prabu Ramachandran, verified that the sticker was created anonymously and without authorization; unauthorized publication of physical advertising is an offence under the act.

On 28 August, in light of Tan Cheng Bock's endorsement of Tan, Ng Kok Song questioned Tan's political independence. Ng stated that it was questionable for Tan to claim to be an independent candidate when he has been dependent on opposition party leaders, additionally accusing Tan of "making a mockery of the presidency" and that "political parties should wait for the next general election to make their point instead of confusing voters into thinking that this is a general election". Ng also concluded that such blatant political endorsements of Tan polarise voters by politicising the presidential election and that by doing so have "dishonoured the office of the President as a unifying non-partisan position."

On 29 August, the Progress Singapore Party (PSP) responded that they had "denied any claims" and insisted that they would "neither endorse nor support any candidates" even when party volunteers received an email to register as counting agents for Tan, whose endorsements can negatively influence the party, according to their central executive committee (CEC) members. On the same day, Ng reiterated the meaning of non-partisan to the media during his walkabout at Marine Parade, that Singaporeans do not want a president "who's manipulated by either the governing party or by the opposition parties", in their response to Tan's endorsements. Tharman Shanmugaratnam responded on media during a walkabout at Sengkang that he found it "absurd" and concerning that his rivals are "increasingly sweeping statements" pertaining to being non-partisan, to which Ng replied that he was "misquoted". Tharman urged the voters to take this seriously and felt "very unfortunate" when voters spoil their votes in response to politicisation.

Later that evening, a police report was lodged against a man on a bicycle who disrupted and heckled Ng and his team while Ng conducted his walkabout at Clementi. The man had attempted to ram people with his bicycle, launched into an expletive-laden rant, and then repeatedly shouted Tan's name before he left the scene. Nobody was hurt during the incident, and Ng encouraged people to "behave in a respectful manner". The man surrendered himself to the police the next day, claiming that he had posed a danger to himself with intentions to self-harm. He was sent to the Institute of Mental Health (IMH). Subsequently, security for Ng and his team was enhanced, while the video went viral. Elsewhere, Tan's seconder Lim Tean adjourned his court trial on charges of acting as an advocate or solicitor in an unauthorized manner in 2021, which was initially scheduled for 29 August, after he dismissed his lawyer citing "fundamental disagreements", and to avoid conflicts with the election. District Judge Ong Hian Sun told Lim to find a new lawyer by the next day or represent himself in the trial. On the same day, activist and lawyer M Ravi filed a separate lawsuit with the Supreme Court, in an attempt to disqualify Tharman from the candidacy, citing a breach in the constitution's Article 19 due to Tharman's conviction under the Official Secrets Act. Ravi revealed the following day that the Court dismissed the application and ordered Ravi to pay costs of S$6,000.

On 30 August, the leading opposition party, the Workers' Party (WP), reiterated its objection to the elected presidency in favour of a return to a ceremonial presidency – where the president is appointed by Parliament – and stated that it would not endorse any candidate in the presidential election. The party added that the qualifying criteria for presidential candidates is "skewed towards People's Action Party (PAP)–approved candidates", and the "elected presidency in its current form undermines parliamentary democracy". Meanwhile, screenshots depicting the Reserves & Investment (R&I) Directorate list of employees showing Akilan Shanmugaratnam, the son of Tharman, working as a Finance Ministry officer since June 2022, went viral on social media. In response to the possibility of a conflict of interest, if Tharman wins the presidency, the Ministry of Finance and Public Service Commission Secretariat simultaneously commented that there was "no conflict of interest between Tharman's candidacy in the presidential elections and his son Akilan", and that their decision to rotate his post back in July was to "preempt any possible such conflicts".

The candidates wrapped up their campaigns on the last day prior to the cooling-off day, with Ng and Tan respectively visiting Sengkang and Hougang, with Ng visiting the sub-region of Lorong Ah Soo and the Foo Hai Ch'an Monastery before ending at Kopitiam Square in Sengkang, while Tan was at Hougang Central. Tharman visited Marine Parade, including the Marine Parade Central Market and Food Centre.

=== Television broadcasts ===
Times are Singapore Standard Time (SST), which is UTC+08:00.

Date	Event
24 August	First Presidential Candidate Broadcast
28 August	CNA Presidential Forum
30 August	Second Presidential Candidate Broadcast

Language	Time	Channels/Radio stations
English	19:00	CNA, CNA938, MONEY FM 89.3, ONE FM 91.3, Kiss92, Power 98
English	21:30	Channel 5, Gold 905, Class 95
Malay	21:30	Suria, Warna 942
Tamil	21:00	Vasantham, Oli 968
Mandarin Chinese	22:30	Channel 8, Capital 958, 96.3 Hao FM, UFM100.3 and 883Jia
Mandarin Chinese	23:30	Channel U

==== First Presidential Candidate Broadcast ====
The first of the two rounds of the Presidential Candidate Broadcast was held on 24 August; the order of the candidates appearing in this round was based on the alphabetical order of their surnames. Ng said that "the time has come" for a president to be fully non-partisan and said that he was neither endorsed nor represented by a political party, specifically the ruling People's Action Party. He said that the president's role would serve as a "constitutional check" on a bad government that might raid the country's reserves, or appoint incompetent or corrupt individuals to key public-service positions. He added that Singapore can "no longer take for granted" that it will always have a "good and honest" government, adding that there is a need for external checks, as with good corporate governance, and that an "ownself check ownself" system is not reliable. He also pledged to "Do Well, Do Right and Do Good" to provide resilience of body and mind.

Tharman said that he would bring his ideal of "independence of mind" and "respect", should he be elected, and that he wanted to become a "unifying figure at home and to advance Singapore's interests abroad". He added that modern-day Singapore's democracy, as well as the current political climate in the world, were diverse but also challenging at times, concerning a political divide. He also had plans to voice views in Singapore so as to prove that Singapore would "never become just another small country" and said that he was an "optimist in our future".

Tan highlighted two key duties of the president, given his 30 years prior experience as a CEO of NTUC Income Insurance Cooperative. One, to safeguard Singapore's reserves, he intends to invest "prudently" with the support of the government for the benefit of Singaporeans. Two, to protect the integrity of public service. He values the efforts of, and emphasises the need for, talented people with many years of working experience and possessing practical skills, not just scholars, to form a good team, and that he would give such people the opportunity to be promoted to leadership positions. He also stated that he did not intend to be an "adversary to the elected government", but said that he would collaborate more with the government and reiterated his belief in the "spirit of unity and pride", as well as connecting with ordinary people and "their hardship and aspirations". Prior to the broadcast, both ELD and the Infocomm Media Development Authority had amended Tan's script by removing some inaccuracies, specifically on the president's role and on soliciting voters.

==== CNA Presidential Forum ====
The CNA forum was held on 28 August at about 21:09, with Otelli Edwards hosting. Eight questions are asked of three candidates in order, each making closing statements:

- What experience and expertise do you possess, that make you the most qualified candidate to be the President?
- Beyond what the Government tells you, what factors would you consider before using the second key to the Past Reserves?
- How can you convince voters you are not politicising the election and will exercise your powers without fear or favour?
- What unique traits do you possess that will help you represent Singapore on the global stage?
- What role would you play as president to build a more inclusive and compassionate society?
- How do you plan to connect with young Singaporeans and involve them in writing the next chapter of the Singapore story?
- Beyond your ceremonial and community roles, how do you intend to be a unifying figure for the nation?
- What major challenges will Singapore face and how will you, within the powers of the President, help Singaporeans to cope?

The forum was rerun on Channel 5 at 21:00 the day after, 29 August.

==== Second Presidential Candidate Broadcast ====
The second of the two rounds of the Presidential Candidate Broadcast was held on 30 August; the order of the candidates appearing in this round of broadcast was reversed from the first round.

Tan Kin Lian acknowledged that the president has no executive authority over day-to-day issues, particularly those affecting younger people, but that he could focus on using "soft influence" to encourage change, hoping to "achieve our common goals for the benefit of Singapore". Furthermore, he publicly apologised in response to the criticism he had received over his social media posts about women from some sectors of the public, specifically from the Association of Women for Action and Research (AWARE). He added that he would be "more mindful of what I say" going forward. Tan also highlighted that one could factor his experience as president from making "sound investment decisions" at NTUC Income and from representing the country in an international insurance federation.

Tharman highlighted his track record of connecting with people from all backgrounds in his former Taman Jurong division of Jurong GRC, from when he was a member of parliament (MP) of the People's Action Party (PAP) for 22 years—his ministerial positions including being Minister of Finance, Deputy Prime Minister, and Senior Minister—and from his experience working with international organisations such as the G20, the International Monetary Fund (IMF), the United Nations (UN), and the World Economic Forum (WEF). He also mentioned that the demands on the president have increased due to the "new and challenging future" where Singaporeans faced an increasing trend of "profound global risks and uncertainties", and to "differentiate him from an actual partisan candidate", stressing that his motives, despite his political background, have "never been politically partisan".

Ng warned that politics in Singapore have become "highly contestable". He added that the country cannot afford to have a president who may be beholden to political parties, to serve their agenda, and reiterated the flaw in relying on an "ownself check ownself" mechanism. He believed the current generational transition of the ruling People's Action Party (PAP) government carries "uncertainties and risks" which have been due to scandals plaguing the party over the past month – such as the arrests of Transport Minister S Iswaran over allegations of corruption, and the resignations of MPs Tan Chuan-Jin and Cheng Li Hui over an extramarital affair. He also alluded to Tharman, by questioning whether it is appropriate for an ex-finance minister who "had set fiscal policies to then move across the table and become the president and be a check on the very policies that he had put in place". He also brought up the 1984 National Day Rally speech of then Prime Minister Lee Kuan Yew, stating that Singaporeans should be aware of "silver-tongued politicians who make empty promises". He concluded that Singapore needs a truly independent president, like himself, to break from its past of having a president always endorsed by the PAP, to protect the country's reserves from being squandered by a potential rogue government.

=== Social media ===
All social media events and campaigning occurred in 2023, unless otherwise stated, and are listed in chronological order.

Date	Event	NKS	TKL	TS	Method	Venue/Social Media Channel	Source
17 August	TDK Podcast No. 234	✔			Online	Grvty Media/YouTube-The Daily Ketchup Podcast	
23 August	PE2023 Full Interview Podcast		✔		Online	YouTube-Zyrup Media	
23 August	PE2023 Full Interview Podcast			✔	Online	YouTube-Zyrup Media	
23 August	PE2023 Full Interview Podcast	✔			Online	YouTube-Zyrup Media	
24 August	CNA Speaks to Presidential Candidate	✔			Televised	Mediacorp/YouTube's CNA channel	
25 August	Election Meeting			✔	Physical	Pasir Panjang Power Station	
25 August	NUSS Meet The Presidential Candidate	✔			Hybrid	NUSS Guide House/YouTube-Ng Kok Song	
25 August	CNA Speaks to Presidential Candidate			✔	Televised	Mediacorp/YouTube's CNA channel	
25 August	TDK Podcast No. 236		✔		Online	Grvty Media/YouTube-The Daily Ketchup Podcast	
26 August	NUSS Meet The Presidential Candidate		✔		Hybrid	NUSS Guide House/Facebook-Tan Kin Lian	
26 August	CNA Speaks to Presidential Candidate		✔		Televised	Mediacorp/YouTube's CNA channel	
27 August	Ask The Next President Anything	✔		✔	Online	SPH Media/YouTube-The Straits Times	
28 August	Presidential Forum	✔	✔	✔	Televised	Mediacorp/YouTube's CNA channel	
30 August	TDK Podcast No. 238			✔	Online	Grvty Media/YouTube-The Daily Ketchup Podcast	

=== Campaign expenditures ===
On 20 October, the presidential candidates' expenditure reports were published by the Elections Department. According to the reports, Tharman had spent S$738,717, Ng S$312,131, and Tan S$71,366. By comparison, in the previous presidential election in 2017, which was not contested, sole candidate Yacob had reported spending S$220,875.

Tharman also reported the receipt of about S$800,000 in donations from eight different donors, and stated in his expenditure report that the unspent amounts would be returned to their respective donors. Tan received donations amounting to about S$41,800 from about 120 donors, and reported that Tan Cheng Bock and Chee Soon Juan were not amongst his donors. Ng financed his campaign using his own personal funds and therefore did not report having received any donations.

=== Cooling-off day controversy ===
On 2 October, the Elections Department reported that they had filed police reports on both M Ravi and Iris Koh, the founders of anti-vaccination activist group Healing the Divide, for repeatedly publishing online election advertising on TikTok and Facebook during both the cooling-off period and Polling Day, when campaigning and advertising are strictly prohibited. According to media reports, Koh had also accused journalists of bias whilst at Tan's residence after polls closed. The assistant Returning Officer of the Elections Department issued correction requests to TikTok and Meta, and all the relevant videos posted by them were removed.

== Polling ==
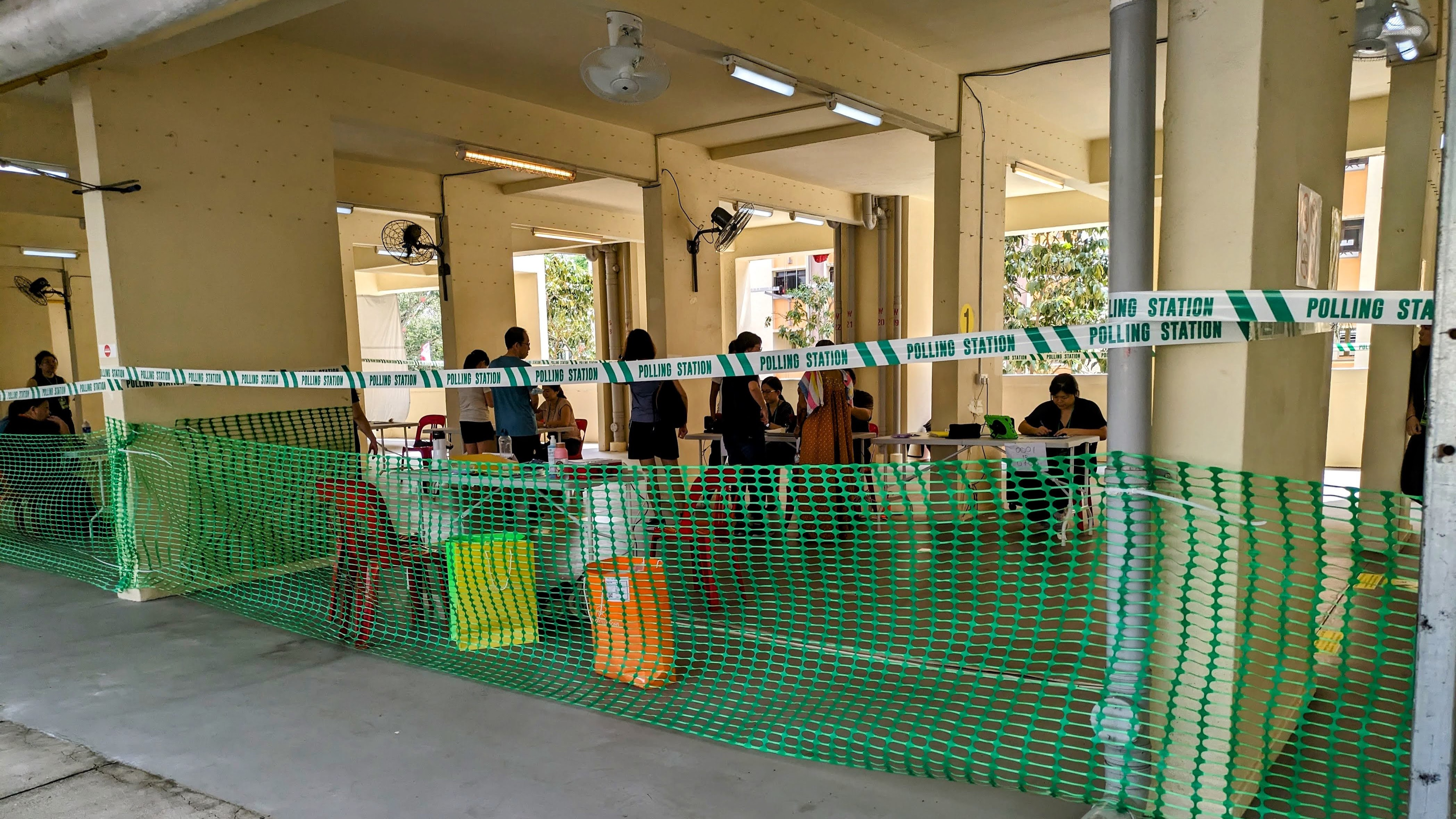
Voters queuing up to vote at a polling station for the next president

Polling Day was on 1 September 2023, and polling stations were open from 08:00 to 20:00 SST (UTC+08:00). As with elections since 2015, a sample count was released by the Elections Department prior to the announcement of the actual results to prevent any unnecessary speculation or reliance on unofficial sources of information while counting was still under way. A standby counting machine was also used in the event of an election recount, which is automatically triggered when the top two candidates have a winning margin of within 2%.

According to the newspaper Lianhe Zaobao, a viral image surfaced online, during the polling, where one of the polling stations had refused entry to a female voter who was wearing a shirt with pineapple prints, which amounted to political propaganda and canvassing, which were legally forbidden during cooling-off and polling days.

By 12:00, four hours after the polls opened, 1,406,182 Singaporeans, representing about 52% of the electorate, had cast their votes. That number had increased to 2,004,961 (74%) as of 15:00, and to 2,302,996 (85%) as of 17:00.

== Results ==
Sample counts were announced at about 22:42 and showed that Tharman Shanmugaratnam was leading with 70% of the votes, followed by Ng Kok Song with 16%, and Tan Kin Lian with 14%. At about 23:15, Ng conceded during a press conference and congratulated Tharman, stating that there was a clear result and there was no need to wait for the final results. At about 23:30, Tan congratulated Tharman, but refused to concede until the actual results were announced. The local results were announced at about 00:23 the next day.

The final turnout (excluding the overseas electorate) was 2,530,912 (93.41%), lower than 2011's and 2020's turnouts of 94.80% and 95.81%, respectively. The Elections Department published the overseas vote count on 12 September. Only 3,799 votes were accepted for counting, of which only 78 votes were rejected. Tharman Shanmugaratnam, Ng Kok Song, and Tan Kin Lian garnered 2,834 (76.16%), 595 (15.99%), and 292 (7.85%) votes, respectively, which saw only a 0.01% change in Tharman's and Tan's respective voting percentages. ELD also said that 2,997 postal votes had been downloaded and 2,263 mails were received as of the cut-off date of 11 September, of which only 1,345 had been accepted. The final turnout was 2,534,711, increasing its percentage by 0.14%, from 93.41% to 93.55%.

Candidate	Votes	%
Tharman Shanmugaratnam	1,749,261	70.41
Ng Kok Song	390,636	15.72
Tan Kin Lian	344,584	13.87
Total	2,484,481	100.00
Valid votes	2,484,481	98.02
Invalid/blank votes	50,230	1.98
Total votes	2,534,711	100.00
Registered voters/turnout	2,709,455	93.55
Source: Elections Department

== Reactions ==
=== Domestic ===
On 2 September 2023, shortly after the announcement of the election results, Prime Minister Lee Hsien Loong congratulated Tharman Shanmugaratnam on his election, citing confidence in Tharman's ability to carry out his new duties as president "with distinction" and intention to work closely with the government. Lee also thanked the two losing candidates for their participation, the election officials for their hard work, and overseas voters for fulfilling their civic duty. Now that the election was over, Lee urged Singapore to "tackle the challenges ahead and build a stronger and more united nation". Deputy Prime Ministers Lawrence Wong and Heng Swee Keat also congratulated Tharman in separate posts, so did Lee's wife, Ho Ching, and his younger brother Hsien Yang.

The other candidates separately congratulated Tharman. Ng Kok Song, on his media at one-north, said that he had achieved the "No. 1 goal" of allowing Singaporeans an opportunity to vote, which was his main objective while standing for the presidency. He further thanked Singaporeans for their recognition and pledged that he would continue to work with them, and also added that "non-partisanship will now enter the vocabulary of governance in Singapore". At his residence in Yio Chu Kang, Tan Kin Lian announced that he would, on his family's advice, "take things easy", and thanked his supporters and the opposition figures who were present for their support. He would continue to reflect on his election bid and voice policy concerns.

Opposition figures also sent congratulatory messages to Tharman; Workers' Party secretary-general Pritam Singh wrote on Facebook that changes were necessary, and his party would continue to push for such, adding that the elected presidency was "well-known". He also revealed that he had worn his blue-collared shirt during Polling Day to mark the occasion. Former presidential candidate and Progress Singapore Party (PSP) founder Tan Cheng Bock also congratulated Tharman in a Facebook post a day later, saying that Tharman's campaign was "well-organised and dignified" and saying that Tharman "is the people's choice". Current PSP Secretary-general, Leong Mun Wai, also congratulated Tharman and said that the election was a "testimony to the fact that Singaporean voters do not vote along racial lines". He also said that a 'race-based' Group Representation Constituency system is "no longer relevant". Singapore Democratic Party's Secretary-general Chee Soon Juan posted on Instagram to congratulate Tharman, hoping that Tharman would discharge his duties "faithfully, both in spirit and letter". Red Dot United's secretary-general Ravi Philemon also congratulated Tharman, citing their team's dignified contest during the 2020 election.

Several other labour unions also sent congratulatory messages to Tharman: Singapore Indian Chamber of Commerce and Industry chairman and former Nominated Member of Parliament Neil Parekh wrote that the community has benefitted much from Tharman's good counsel, and would invite him as a guest-of-honour for the chamber's centenary celebrations in 2024.

In the early morning, the Taman Jurong Market and Food Centre was crowded in celebration of Tharman's election, with his supporters bringing out pineapples, chanting Ong lai huat ah (lit. Good Fortune), and singing the national anthem, "Majulah Singapura". Tharman visited several sites, such as Marsiling Mall (with Senior Minister of State and Marsiling's MP Zaqy Mohamad), then Our Tampines Hub, and HDB Hub, to thank supporters. In a prior interview before results were announced, Tharman was "humbled" by how Singaporeans had trusted him for many years and called the election a "vote of optimism for a future". He also praised his rivals for having "put full effort and energy into their campaigns", and respected the voters who did not vote for him, thanking them for "following the issues closely". Furthermore, he said that he had not been expecting a "high degree of endorsement" but told that there was a fair number of people who normally were against PAP but who knew this was a presidential election and not a political or general election. He took notice of the generational transition and hoped that his presidency would keep it a respectful one. On 6 September, Jurong GRC residents voiced concerns to Red Dot United, including those relating to the high cost of living, inflation, and the GST increasing to 9% by year's end.

In the food and beverage sector, several bakeries and island-wide food chains reported a boost in sales of pineapple-related food products, upon Tharman's election. The lottery game 4D revealed that the three numbers 1388, 1572, and 7040, which were the respective polling percentages, sold out quickly, within five minutes after the results were announced. However, none of the numbers showed up on either draw that weekend. Shortly after the polls closed, another viral video of a toddler repeatedly exclaiming Tharman's name over Ng's had surfaced on TikTok. The toddler's father and the uploader, Faisal Marican, thanked netizens for the video responses and informed them that The Istana had sent an invitation to the toddler. In the education sector, in response to the issuance of Writ of Election earlier, the Ministry of Education (MOE) announced that they would reschedule its Teacher's Day celebrations, from the original date of 1 September to 11 September, and reschedule its GCE 'N' Level examinations, from the original date of 11 September to 12 and 20 September.

=== International ===
- Belarus: President Alexander Lukashenko congratulated Tharman, expressing confidence that Tharman would succeed in improving the well-being of citizens and stimulating economic growth and its relationship between the two countries.
- Canada: The Canadian High Commission congratulated Tharman for his victory, and thanked outgoing President Halimah Yacob for her contributions to the relationship between Canada and Singapore.
- China: President Xi Jinping called to congratulate Tharman via phone call, according to Xinhua News Agency, and added that he would continue to work with him to improve their relationship.
- European Union: Ambassador to Singapore Iwona Piórko congratulated Tharman and said that the EU and Singapore have a deepening partnership that contributes effectiveness to addressing global and regional challenges.
- India: Prime Minister Narendra Modi congratulated Tharman and posted on Twitter that he will be looking forward to working closely on bilateral ties and its India–Singapore Strategic Partnership.
- Italy: Ambassador-designate to Singapore Dante Brandi posted on the Ambasciata d'Italia a Singapore's Instagram page a picture of his appearance at the G20 Finance Ministers and Central Bank Governors 2021 meeting as a commemoration of his win.
- Malaysia:
  - Prime Minister Anwar Ibrahim sent congratulatory messages to Tharman who "conjured Singapore's presidency", and stated his desire for an underlying bond of "family spirit" between the neighbouring nations.
  - Malaysian United Democratic Alliance (MUDA) founder and former minister Syed Saddiq also congratulated Tharman, saying that his victory truly united Singaporeans, transcending race, religion and politics, and reminded that it was an "unbreakable bond of family".
- Saudi Arabia: King Salman and his Crown Prince Mohammed bin Salman both congratulated Tharman and gave wishes for "success" and "further progress and prosperity."
- Taiwan: Outgoing President Tsai Ing-wen offered her congratulations to Tharman in a press release, accompanied by a congratulatory letter expressing her hope of furthering bilateral ties. Tsai also said that "Taiwan attaches great importance to its relations with Singapore", and looks forward for him to seek bilateral cooperation with Taiwan.
- Ukraine: Ambassador to Singapore Kateryna Zelenko congratulated Tharman, and said that "We look forward to further good cooperation and friendship" between Singapore and Ukraine.
- United Arab Emirates: President Mohamed bin Zayed Al Nahyan, Vice President and Prime Minister Mohammed bin Rashid Al Maktoum, and Deputy Prime Minister Mansour bin Zayed Al Nahyan congratulated Tharman's victory through cabling.
- United Kingdom:
  - King Charles III congratulated Tharman on his inauguration via Twitter, saying that "Singapore is a strategic partner" and would look forward to work with him to continue their relationship.
  - Wolfson College's president Jane Clarke congratulated Tharman, an alumnus of the college. Clarke told she met him earlier that year and praised his mention of "fondness for Wolfson and his commitment to our shared vision of opportunity for all".
- United States: United States Department of State spokesman Matthew Miller congratulated Tharman, and stated that the department would be looking forward to working with him in further strengthening the relationship between Singapore and the United States. He also thanked outgoing President Halimah Yacob for her contributions.
- Vietnam: President Võ Văn Thưởng mailed a letter congratulating Tharman on his inauguration on 14 September.

== Analysis ==
=== Pre-Nomination Day ===
On 14 August TODAY interviewed 15 first-time presidential election voters, with ages ranging from 21 to 33, on their knowledge of the elected presidency. Their responses ranged from a few who indicated little knowledge or interest in politics to a handful who understood the topic well.

The following day, TODAY and CNA conducted a survey of 1,500 first-time voters, where the vast majority of them understood most of the presidential roles. The roles of being a symbolic figure and a diplomat were identified by about 95% of them, followed by at 91% knowing about the requirements of caring for the community and consulting with the Council of Presidential Advisors, with 88.4% understanding that the president is required to safeguard asset reserves. Only 36.1% knew that the president does not take orders from Parliament.

TODAY and CNA conducted another survey about the relationship between Parliament and the President, where some knew that the elected president generally takes instructions from the Cabinet. Analysts revealed that most first-time voters having a poor understanding of the election may imply that they have little to no interest in politics. Former Member of Parliament Inderjit Singh hinted that these first-timers may be "swayed by populist manifestos of some candidates without having the opportunity to verify facts". Kantar Public analyst Leong Chan-Hoong noted significant changes with educated Singaporeans in mind, and that the young voters may not be apparent to such a demographic.

=== On Nomination Day ===
When candidates were confirmed on 18 August, many political analysts predicted that Tharman Shanmugaratnam would win and cited the slate of candidates being "very different" with candidates being from two racial groups. Institute of Policy Studies Senior Researcher Gillian Koh suggested that the voters would find it difficult to resist Tharman's "unparalleled international standing". Associate Professor of law at Singapore Management University Eugene Tan predicted that people would "assume his victory is a foregone conclusion" but that should not be taken for granted. Tan thought it praiseworthy that the three candidates had experience in making strategic decisions with regard to the management of large funds, as well as having fine reputations.

Analysts had differing views regarding George Goh's ineligibility to run for the presidency. Mustafa Izzuddin, a senior international affairs analyst at Solaris Strategies Singapore, was surprised that Goh was ineligible. To him, Goh could bring something unique to the table, due to his private sector experience. It would give voters an additional choice. Eugene Tan agreed with Goh being ineligible, highlighting the difference in calculating the required shareholder equity of S$500 million on the basis of one, versus many, companies. To him, one S$500 million company is different from running five hundred S$1 million companies. Therefore, he felt that the Presidential Elections Committee's decision was understandable.

=== During campaigning period ===
On 27 August, National University of Singapore (NUS) Sociologist Ern Ser Tan noted on LinkedIn that there was an "undercurrent" with the election turning on maintaining the current political order versus seeking regime change, with the likelihood of political transformation. He added that, with Tan Kin Lian's involvement with Tan Cheng Bock and Tan Jee Say, the election has become clearly defined by the differences between the political orders of the ruling government and the opposition. NUS Arts and Social Science Lecturer Rebecca Grace Tan was reported to have referred the term 'Independent' to that of the People's Action Party, and that Tharman's decisive win wasn't decisive in signifying that non-partisanship was the primary deciding factor for many voters. Tan's opposition support sowed further doubts about the advantages of being non-partisan.

In light of the "One vote, Three presidents?" slogan which surfaced on 28 August, political observers began to query Tan Kin Lian about the assertion that he is an "independent candidate". Eugene Tan commented that "It effectively asserts that if Tan (Kin Lian) wins, he will attempt to transform the presidency into a partisan institution" and further stated that a non-partisan president "must be above the political fray". Eugene Tan believed that party endorsements or endorsements by politicians can make the president beholden to the opposition politicians and ruin the presidency.

School of Social Sciences, at the Nanyang Technological University (NTU), Assistant Professor Walid Jumblatt Abdullah's analysis suggests that Tan Kin Lian was attempting to position himself as the "ultimate anti-establishment candidate". Felix Tan, another lecturer at NTU, said that voting for Tan would suggest voting for opposition, which belies being non-partisan, and that Tan's smear campaigning brought doubt on his being worthy of standing as a candidate. He also stressed that the relationship between general and presidential elections is "conflated" and that can affect democracy.

In a radio interview on MONEY FM 89.3, on "Breakfast with Lynlee Foo and Ryan Huang" on 30 August, Eugene Tan praised the widespread use of social media to communicate in the election.

=== After the release of election results ===
When the sample counts were released on 2 September, political analysts suggested that Tharman's personal charisma and past track record and experience, including his constituency of Jurong GRC being the best-performing constituency for two consecutive elections in 2015 and 2020, may have attributed to a landslide victory, as opposed to Ng's lack of public exposure and Tan's previous controversies, which to Eugene Tan, cited in the CNA Polling Day results special, was a "mind-boggling" result. Eugene Tan also highlighted Tan's relationship with opposition parties, stating that Tan had "too [many] oppositional forces [involved in] his candidacy". In addition, Tan's campaign had a misconception of what the president did as well as expressing views that were perceived as "misogynist, racist, [and] even nativist", which a majority of Singaporeans overwhelmingly rejected.

Eugene Tan also noted that the slight decline in turnout and an increase in spoilt votes meant that the election "generally [did] not make much of a difference" and was an effort at a "protest vote". He added that "the drop would be rather significant as this would signal that there might still be those who have some concerns with how the Presidential Election was run". During the 2011 presidential election, turnout was 94.80% (of which 1.79% or 37,849 votes were rejected), while during the 2023 presidential election, turnout was 93.41% (of which 1.98% or 50,152 votes were rejected).

The reactions of other political analysts to the election results varied, such as NTU political analyst Dr Felix Tan saying that it was "rather unexpected and it's quite a surprise", and emphasising that "establishment versus anti-establishment" might have attributed to the anticlimactic result; and NUS Associate Professor Chong Ja Ian criticising the result, stating that what Tharman had was a huge advantage against "two weak opponents" and feeling that the result was to elect "strong candidates like everyone else". Chong highlighted the short campaigning period of just nine days, as well as Tan's "negative spillover effect" onto opposition supporters, as contributing to both Tan's and Ng's respective decisive defeats.

Following the election, Gillian Koh thought that the landslide was the result of the "Tharman effect", a term which was coined during the 45th St. Gallen Symposium, in 2015, where Tharman was one of the participants. Tharman's campaign was acclaimed by several analysts. Eugene Tan pointed out that Tharman's slogan, "race is never absent, but it is not the only factor", would be seen as signifying an evolution of the nation, praised the voters for voting for the merits of his personal qualities and track record, and praised the PAP government for promoting "multiracial meritocracy". In another interview, on the Mothership website, Eugene Tan said that "Singaporean voters are sophisticated" and that they have treated the presidential election as it is and not as "a proxy general election or a referendum on the People's Action Party (PAP)". In answer to a question on how the result will be an indication of the next general election, he warned that the PAP should not treat this result as the "ground being sweet", reminding that parliamentary elections are different, as they are elections between parties rather than individuals.

Leong Chan-Hoong also praised Singaporeans over the results, agreeing that they have voted "about trust of the candidate", over certain doubts and past issues pertaining to the scandals and resignations from the PAP government prior to the election. However, Ng's mention of the "ownself check ownself system" which had been borrowed from opposition parties – specifically from Pritam Singh of the Workers' Party (WP) who first coined the term back in 2011 – also raised concerns, citing that it was "very difficult for someone to set up the system to question the system". Analysts implied that voters should also understand the importance of the authority of the president, in addition to the "bread-and-butter issues".

Singapore Management University visiting professor Lee Kong Chian, and former Nominated Member of Parliament and Legal Adviser to the President and Council of Presidential Advisers Walter Woon said that, in an election like this, the first-past-the-post system only really works when there are two contenders, and that no-contest elections are bad; but that having too many contenders could also be undesirable. He also said that party politics are inevitable, but they are not necessarily decisive. He added that pundits who could predict the trend of Tharman's clear mandate should "take nothing for granted", and that the victory was an unusual one for a multi-candidate contest, which hints at the possibility that there is another establishment candidate who will be able to repeat this feat against a more formidable opponent in future presidential elections.

According to journalists at The Straits Times (ST), in a podcast on 4 September, a "contextualized" traditional campaigning is still effective and voters must be prepared to adapt to such scenarios. In another podcast, with ST's multimedia correspondent Hairianto Diman and deputy news editor Grace Ho, it was pointed out that the election would be seen as determining who would represent in a global-level and the generational changes ahead for the government.

In commentary published on CNA's website, former newspaper editor Han Fook Kwang wrote that the election results are politically significant, as the large margin of victory Tharman enjoyed undermines a claim previously made by members of the Singaporean government that older Singaporeans are not ready to accept a non-Chinese as prime minister. The results were also seen as undermining an argument for a PAP race-related policy that culminated in the enactment of the hiatus-triggered model for presidential elections (in the case for 2017), where candidacies in certain presidential elections are reserved for people of certain minority races.

In an article posted on Mothership, editor Sulaiman Daud commented that Tharman's high probability of winning did not make this election "a charade", but cited Tharman's slogans of "hard carry" and "October Surprise" as contributing to his decisive win. Daud also weighed other factors, such as the competition between the other two rivals, or what Singaporeans want in its next President. Another editor, Tan Min-Wei, also praised the contests and how the election went smoothly, citing a quote from a 1999 American political drama The West Wing that "decisions are made by those who show up". Republic Polytechnic chairman and chief executive officer of Economic Development Innovations Abel Ang said that people like Tharman believed that people lacking common experiences are "unhealthy for Singapore", and that the life of the haves is increasingly looking different from those who have-not. He also referenced a Sesame Street song "The People In Your Neighborhood", one of his favourite songs, as encouraging unity.

== Inauguration ==
Tharman Shanmugratanam's inauguration took place at The Istana on Thursday, 14 September 2023, at around 19:40, marking the start of his six-year term as President of Singapore. Similar to preceding presidents after Benjamin Sheares, Tharman said he would not be residing at The Istana so that he would remain actively involved with Singaporeans. Prime Minister Lee Hsien Loong gave a speech where he said that the election meant the voters had said that the "race is a smaller factor now" and Tharman's election was "on his merits, by an overwhelming majority". Lee added that he respected Tharman's "long and distinguished" career and would look forward for their cooperation. In Tharman's inauguration speech, he swore to be "scrupulous and independent" in fulfilling his presidential role and to carry out the president's custodial powers. He also promised to unify Singapore, to "make us a better society, and add to our ballast as we face a more turbulent world", citing "we only truly succeed when we succeed together". The president being an international diplomat, his maintaining Singapore's principles—in the wake of the current economic trends, the China–United States relations, and the ongoing Russian invasion of Ukraine—was important. He again mentioned that "we must not allow any of our differences to divide us" and again reminded people that Singapore must make sure that "COVID-19 would not be Singapore's last crisis". The inauguration was witnessed by all cabinet ministers (except S Iswaran), emeritus Senior Minister Goh Chok Tong, and former president Tony Tan, along with their spouses; Lee's wife Ho Ching was absent on that day.

In the early morning of 13 September, the day before the inauguration, President Halimah Yacob thanked all the workers and staff members residing in The Istana before she departed for her retirement. Halimah revealed in the final days of her presidency that she recalled on the controversial walkover of the preceding presidential election, but reflected that she was "a president for all people, regardless of race, language, religion", and reflected on the early days of her presidency when security concerns were raised, given that she resided in public housing in Yishun at the time. She also announced her retirement after nearly 22 years of political involvement, and said that she would continue to work with the community "in different capacities", raising awareness for mental health and helping people with disabilities, and with empowering women and advocating for a meritocracy. In her final remarks of her farewell speech, she reminded Singaporeans must retain its values of unity and purpose. Prime Minister Lee Hsien Loong, in his response at her farewell reception later that night, thanked her for fulfilling her promise to be a "President for everyone" and for her commitments during her tenure. MeWATCH and CNA posted a video dedicated to her presidency. On 1 October, Halimah was named as the new chancellor of the Singapore University of Social Sciences. On 25 October, she was awarded the Order of Temasek (with High Distinction).
