= Presidential Elections Committee =

Council by the Government of Singapore

The Presidential Elections Committee (PEC) is a six-member council set up by the Government of Singapore to ensure that each candidate running for the office of President of Singapore fulfils the stringent qualifications set out in Article 19 of the Constitution of Singapore.

== Composition ==
The Presidential Elections Committee consists of:

- Chairman of the Public Service Commission (PSC), who also serves as the Chairman of the Presidential Elections Committee (PEC)
- Chairman of the Accounting and Corporate Regulatory Authority (ACRA)
- a member of the Presidential Council for Minority Rights (PCMR), appointed by the Chairman of PCMR
- a member or former member of the Council of Presidential Advisers (CPA), appointed by the Chairman of CPA, except for the sitting Chairman of CPA or a former member who vacated his seat under Article 37F(2)(a) or (c) of the Constitution
- a person who is qualified to be or has been a Judge of the Supreme Court, appointed by the Chief Justice
- a person, who in the opinion of the Prime Minister has expertise and experience acquired in the private sector that is relevant to the functions of the PEC, appointed by the Prime Minister

There is also a Community Committee, which will assess whether the candidate belongs to the specified ethnic community.

== Criticism ==
=== Amount of discretionary power ===
Legal academic Valentine Winslow wrote that the committee has the power to reject anyone who does not have "integrity, good character, and reputation", and that this places too much discretionary power in the hands of a small group of persons, with no guarantee that they are qualified to judge others as being of integrity and good character, or are unbiased, as there is no provision for any independent election commission.

Constitutional lawyer Thio Li-ann wrote that the mechanism of selecting qualified candidates "removes the power of choice one step further away from the people, placing in the hands of an unelected group of people the power to decide who is a suitable candidate".

=== Decisions beyond judicial review ===
Thio observed that the committee is "not under a legal duty to give reasons for their decision, which is deficient as a process".

=== Opacity of decisions leading to embarrassment ===
Winslow suggested that there is an "embarrassment of uncertainty" for a candidate seeking nomination, because they may be rejected for reasons completely unclear to them, and that "men of eminence" will not agree to be nominated if they are likely to be humiliated by rejection.

== Election Committees ==
=== 2005 Presidential Election ===
The Presidential Elections Committee for the 2005 Singapore presidential election had three members:

- Andrew Chew, Chairman
- Lim Siong Guan
- H R Hochstadt

=== 2017 Presidential Election ===
The Presidential Elections Committee for the 2017 presidential election comprises six members.

- Eddie Teo, Chairman of the Public Service Commission
- Lim Soo Hoon, Chairwoman of the Accounting and Corporate Regulatory Authority
- Chan Heng Chee, Member of the Presidential Council for Minority Rights
- Po'ad Shaik Abu Bakar Mattar, Member of the Council of Presidential Advisers
- Tay Yong Kwang, Judge of the Court of Appeal
- Peter Seah, Chairman of DBS Bank

The Community Committee is headed by Timothy James de Souza, a member of the Presidential Council of Minority Rights.

==== Malay community sub-committee ====
The Malay community sub-committee, which will issue the Malay Community Certificate to candidates, comprises five members.

- Imram Mohamed, former Chairman of the Association of Muslim Professionals
- Fatimah Azimullah, Advisor to the Singapore Muslim Women's Association
- Mohammad Alami Musa, President of Majlis Ugama Islam Singapura
- Yatiman Yusof, former Senior Parliamentary Secretary
- Zulkifli Baharudin, Non-Resident Ambassador to Uzbekistan and Kazakhstan, and Executive Chairman of Indo-Trans Corporation

All five were also on the Malay Community Committee that gave the green light to Malay candidates in Group Representation Constituencies (GRCs) in the 2015 general election.

=== 2023 Presidential Election ===
The Presidential Elections Committee for the 2023 presidential election comprises six members.

- Lee Tzu Yang, Chairman of the Public Service Commission
- Ong Chong Tee, Chairman of the Accounting and Corporate Regulatory Authority
- Chan Heng Chee, Member of the Presidential Council for Minority Rights
- Chua Thian Poh, Member of the Council of Presidential Advisers
- Kannan Ramesh, Judge of the Court of Appeal
- Quentin Loh, Judge of the High Court

The Community Committee is headed by Edward D'Silva, a member of the Public Service Commission.
