= Ng Kok Song =

Singaporean investor

- 黄国松
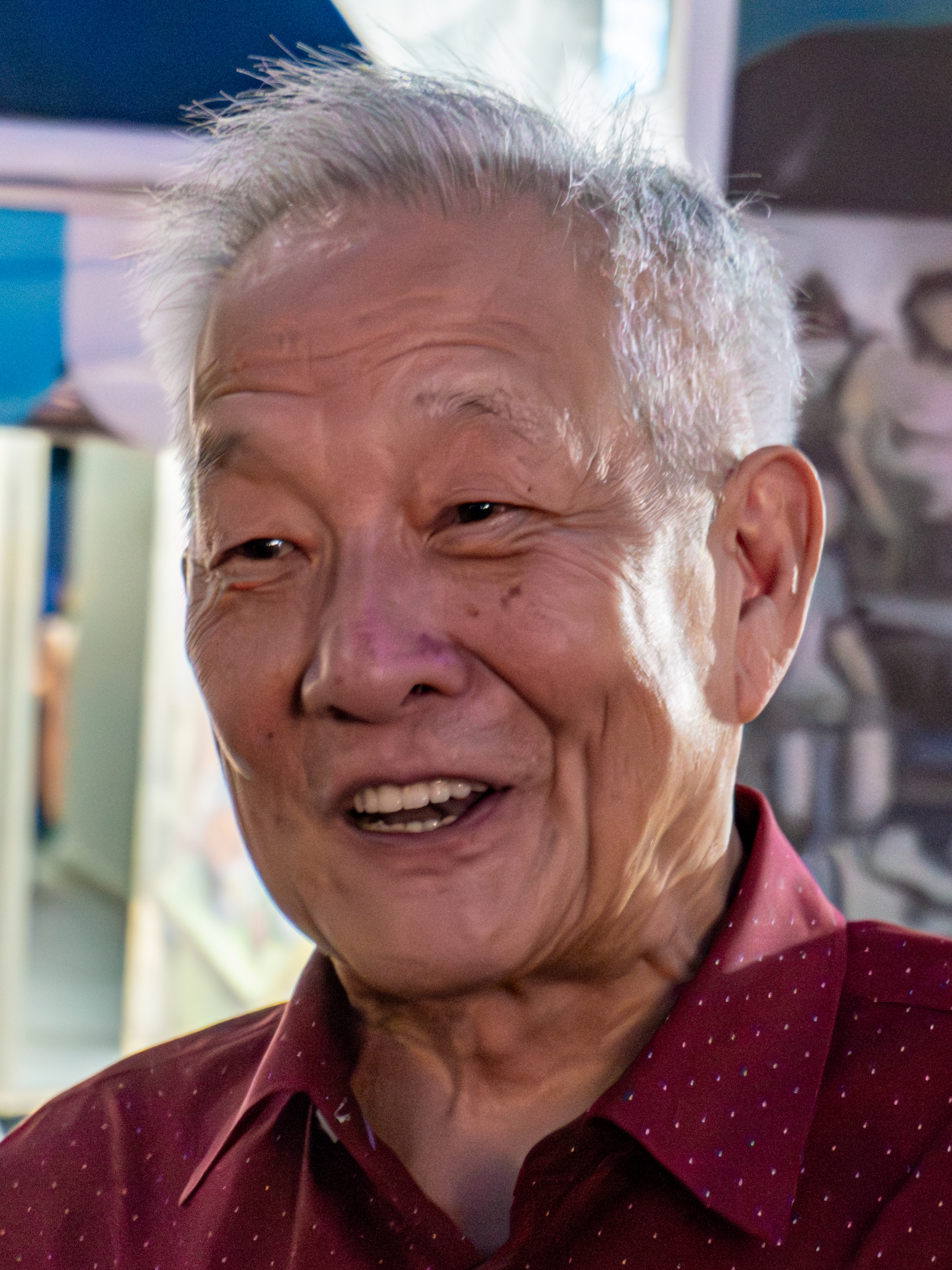
- Ng in 2023
- Born: Ng Kok Song; 11 February 1948 (age 78); Singapore
- Education: University of Singapore (BS); Stanford University (MS)
- Political party: Independent (2023–present)
- Spouse: Patricia Chee (m. 1972; died 2005)
- Partner(s): Sybil Lau (2020–present)
- Children: 3
- Website: www.ngkoksong.com

Peter Ng Kok Song (Note: Chinese: 黄国松; Peng'im: Ng^{5} Gog^{4} Song^{5}) (born 11 February 1948) is a Singaporean financier, fund manager and entrepreneur who served as the chief investment officer of GIC between 2007 and 2013, and director, in charge of foreign exchange market operations of the Monetary Authority of Singapore between 1985 and 1986.

Ng is the founder of asset management company Avanda Investment Management.

Ng was the founding chairman of the Singapore International Monetary Exchange (SIMEX), the predecessor to SGX Group. He also served as a board member of SGX Group between 2013 and 2018, and Temasek Holdings between 2003 and 2005.

In 2023, Ng announced a run for the Singaporean presidential election that year. He received a Certificate of Eligibility by the Presidential Elections Committee and was successfully nominated as one of three candidates. He was unsuccessful in his bid, losing with 15.72% of the votes to Tharman Shanmugaratnam.

== Early life and education ==
Born in Singapore, Ng was the second of 11 children born to a Teochew fish auctioneer and a housewife. He grew up in an attap house with a thatched roof, mud floor and two bedrooms in Kangkar, near modern-day Sengkang, close to the Serangoon River. To support his family, Ng helped his father sort fish at a local market and tended the family's chickens.

Ng was baptised into the Catholic Church when he was seven years old where he served as an altar boy at the nearby Church of the Nativity of the Blessed Virgin Mary in Hougang. He studied at Montfort School for 12 years while looking after his younger siblings.

Ng was awarded a scholarship to study engineering in Canada but was unable to proceed due to his family's financial situation. Instead, he took up a scholarship from the Public Service Commission (PSC) to study physics at the University of Singapore and graduated in 1970 with a Bachelor of Science with honours degree.

In 1980, Ng graduated as a Sloan Fellow with a Master of Science degree in management from Stanford University.

== Career ==
In 1970, Ng started his career in the Ministry of Finance (MOF). He joined the Monetary Authority of Singapore (MAS) in 1971 and served as director between 1985 and 1986. Ng was also the founding Chairman of the Singapore International Monetary Exchange (SIMEX), now incorporated into the Singapore Exchange (SGX).

In 1986, Ng joined the country's sovereign wealth fund, the Government of Singapore Investment Corporation (GIC) and served as its chief investment officer between 2007 and 2013. He was the fund's first non-expatriate director. In 2007, he was made GIC's first group chief investment officer. He was also among those who led GIC in navigating periods of financial turmoil such as the 1997 Asian financial crisis, 2001 dot-com bubble, and the 2008 financial crisis. The Singapore Government awarded Ng the Meritorious Service Medal in 2012, in recognition of his contributions to building and managing the nation's reserves.

From 2001 to 2014, Ng was a member of the Strategic Committee of Agency France Tresor. The French government conferred on him the titles of Legion of Honour "La Croix de Chevalier de la Legion d'Honneur" in 2011 and Order of Merit "Officer de l'ordre National du Merite" in 2003. The CFA Institute conferred on him the Thomas L Hansberger Leadership in Global Investment Award in 2013. He is on the CFA Institute's Advisory Council for the "Future of Finance" project, a long-term global effort to shape a trustworthy financial industry that better serves society.

In 2015, Ng founded Avanda Investment Management with two former GIC colleagues, Quah Wee Ghee and Sung Cheng Chih. Avanda Investment Management received support from leading institutional investors whose contributions helped launch the firm with around US$4 billion in assets. By 2022, its assets had more than doubled to US$10 billion, making it one of Singapore's fastest-growing investment firms.

Since 2017, Ng has been Chairman Emeritus of the Wealth Management Institute at the Nanyang Technological University. He is on the board of directors of 65 Equity Partners (a global investment firm) and on the Global Advisory Board of PIMCO. In public administration (education), he serves on the board of governors for the Asia School of Business in Malaysia. From 2017 to 2023, he served on the governing board for the Lee Kuan Yew School of Public Policy at the National University of Singapore.

== 2023 presidential bid ==
On 15 July 2023, Ng indicated he was "deliberating" running for the 2023 presidential election. On 19 July 2023, Ng turned up at the offices of Elections Department while accompanied by his family to collect the eligibility forms required to be nominated as a presidential candidate. Ng intends to submit himself for considerations under the requirements of the public service deliberative track, based on his tenure as Chief Investment Officer of GIC.

On 3 August 2023, Ng submitted his application for the Certificate of Eligibility. On 18 August 2023, Ng was issued the Certificate of Eligibility by the Presidential Elections Committee (PEC).

On 22 August 2023, Ng successfully filed his nomination papers, confirming his contest for the presidency. In his nomination speech, Ng stressed his political neutrality and his experience with Singapore's reserves, stating that he has never "belonged to any political party" and that he had "spent my entire career at GIC and MAS helping to build up our reserves".

On 2 September, the final results of the election was released. It was revealed that Ng gotten 15.72% of the votes, losing to Tharman Shanmugaratnam’s 70.41% but beating Tan Kin Lian’s 13.87%. He did not win the election, but was able to keep his election deposit.

== Personal life ==
In 1972, Ng married his first wife, Patricia Chee, whom he had met as schoolmates at Montfort School. The couple had three children together. Chee was diagnosed with stomach cancer in 2003 and died in 2005. Since 2020, Ng has been engaged to Sybil Lau, a Canadian-born Singaporean woman who is 30 years younger than him. As Lau's mother died in 2021, the couple decided to postpone their marriage, adhering to a customary three-year mourning period.

Ng is a Catholic. He is an avid proponent of Christian meditation, which was taught to him by Benedictine monk Laurence Freeman. Ng reportedly taught Lee Kuan Yew, the founding prime minister of Singapore, how to meditate in the late 2000s.

In 2023, Reel Lumina in collaboration with production company PixelMusica, launched a documentary entitled "Leading Against the Odds", where they featured Ng sharing about the values that have guided his life and leadership.
