= George Goh =

Singaporean businessman

- 吴振华

Non-Resident Ambassador of Singapore to Morocco
- In office 1 June 2017 – 9 June 2023
- Minister: Vivian Balakrishnan

Personal details
- Born: 25 November 1959 (age 66) Negeri Sembilan, Federation of Malaya (now Malaysia)
- Citizenship: Malaysia (1959–1990); Singapore (1990–present)
- Party: Independent
- Spouse(s): Tan Nan Ci (died) Lysa Sumali (m. 2001)
- Children: 4
- Education: Trinity College London
- Occupation: Businessman; entrepreneur; philanthropist; diplomat
- Website: georgegohchingwah.com

George Goh Ching Wah (Note: Chinese: 吴振华; Pe̍h-ōe-jī: Gô͘ Chín-hôa; pinyin: Wú Zhènhuá) (born 25 November 1959) is a Malaysian-born Singaporean businessman, entrepreneur, philanthropist, and former diplomat who is the chairman of Ossia International and the founder of Harvey Norman Ossia. He was the Non-Resident Ambassador of Singapore to Morocco between 2017 and 2023.

On 12 June 2023, Goh announced his intention to run for the President of Singapore and stand in the 2023 presidential election.

On 18 August 2023, the Elections Department announced that Goh did not qualify to run for the presidential election and therefore did not receive the Certificate of Eligibility.

== Early life and education ==
Born in Negeri Sembilan during the era of the Federation of Malaya, Goh was one of the eight children in his family. Due to his family's financial situation, Goh dropped out of school and moved to Singapore, having started working at the age of 16, to support his family. Goh found a job as a sweeper and general worker on a weekly salary of $15 at a shoe factory in Geylang.

In 2022, Goh graduated in music performance from Trinity College London after having studied music, specializing in classical singing.

== Business career ==
Throughout his career, Goh has owned several listed companies, including Ossia International, Harvey Norman Ossia, and United EnviroTech.

Goh started DeClassici Shoe Manufacturer in 1982, in a factory at Bartley Road, producing 30 pairs of leather shoes every month.

In 1990, he co-founded Ossia International Limited and serves as its group chairman. In 1996, Ossia was publicly listed on the Singapore Stock Exchange.

Later that year, Ossia established a property division, Ossia Land. In the following year, Goh collaborated with Waterbank Properties, NatSteel Properties, and a LSE-listed company Regalion Properties as a part of Ossia Land's venture.

In 1999, Goh partnered Gerry Harvey of multi-national retailer Harvey Norman to establish a S$33 million joint venture named Harvey Norman Ossia (Asia) to retail the Harvey Norman brand in Asia.

In 2000, Goh founded ITG International, an internet technology company that expanded into property development in 2005. In 2002, Goh founded VGO Corporation (World of Sport). VGO Corp carried out an acquisition of a mixed property development group of companies in Malaysia in 2017.

In 2003, Goh co-founded wastewater treatment firm United EnviroTech. In 2005, Goh founded SGL Capital Investment Management, a property fund management company.

== Other roles ==
On 1 June 2017, then-President Tony Tan appointed Goh as Singapore Non-Resident Ambassador to Morocco. On 9 June 2023, Goh tendered his resignation to the Ministry of Foreign Affairs to run for the 2023 presidential election.

Goh is both a council member of the Singapore Red Cross and a member of the Singapore Red Cross Society's operational committee for humanitarian assistance and international relief.

Goh is an executive board member of the Presbyterian Community Services. He is an advisor to the Puan Noor Aishah Intercultural Institute and served as a board member of the Creative Malay Arts and Culture.

Outside Singapore, Goh is the Founder of the Institute of Innovation and Entrepreneurship and Adjunct Lecturer at BML Munjal University and Tribhuvan University in India. He is also an Honorary Advisor to the Vice Chancellor of the Royal University of Bhutan and an Advisor to the President on Internationalization for Mohammed V University in Rabat, Morocco.

In 2015, Goh and his wife co-founded Border Mission Limited, a charity organisation that supports those in need in Singapore, the Himalayan region and developing countries. The ‘Happy People Helping People’, a prominent community group dedicated to helping the elderly poor, has also backed Goh's presidential bid.

== 2023 presidential bid ==
On 12 June 2023, Goh announced his intention to run for the 2023 presidential election under the private sector deliberative track.

On 18 August 2023, the Elections Department announced that Goh did not qualify to run for the presidential election and therefore did not receive the Certificate of Eligibility.

== Personal life ==
At age 24, Goh married Tan Nan Ci, with whom he had three children. Tan died of pancreatic cancer when she was the age of 40. In 2001, Goh married his second wife, Lysa Sumali, with whom he had a daughter.
