= U of E =

U of E may refer to:

in Great Britain

- University of Edinburgh
- University of Exeter

in the Philippines

- University of the East

in the United States

- University of Evansville, a university located in Indiana

== See also ==
- UE (disambiguation)
