= UE =

UE or Ue may refer to:

== Business ==
- Ultimate Ears, a manufacturer based in Irvine, California
- Union Electric Company, a defunct utility company
- United Electrical, Radio and Machine Workers of America, a trade union
- United Envirotech, a company based in Singapore
- Universal Edition, a music publisher

== Computing ==
- Unreal Engine, a 3D game engine developed by Epic Games
- User equipment, a term used in telecommunications systems

== Education ==
- University of Evansville, a university in Indiana, United States
- University of Education, a university in Pakistan
- University of the East, a university in the Philippines

== Language ==
- Ue (digraph), a digraph used in some writing systems
  - Ue, the digraph used to represent Ü
- Ue (Cyrillic), a letter in the Cyrillic alphabet

== Other uses ==
- German Type UE I submarine of WWI
- German Type UE II submarine of WWI
- United Empire Loyalists' post-nominal letters
- Urban exploration
- Use of English, a subject in the Hong Kong Advanced Level Examination

== See also ==
- German Type UE submarine (disambiguation)
