= Iris Koh =

Singaporean anti-vaccination activist

Iris Koh Hsiao Pei
- 许晓沛
- Born: Iris Koh Shu Cii (许淑慈); 11 January 1976 (age 50); Singapore
- Occupation: Activist
- Organization: Healing the Divide
- Spouse: Raymond Ng (m. 2007)

Iris Koh Hsiao Pei (Note: Chinese: 许晓沛; pinyin: Xū Xiǎopèi) (born Iris Koh Shu Cii, (Note: Chinese: 许淑慈; pinyin: Xū Shūcí) 11 January 1976) is a Singaporean anti-vaccination activist and the founder of the anti-vaccination activism group Healing the Divide.

== Activism ==
During the COVID-19 pandemic in Singapore, Koh founded the Healing the Divide group and claimed to "fill an information gap about COVID-19". In October 2021, Koh and her husband, Raymond Ng, reportedly encouraged over 2,000 members of Healing the Divide to flood several public hotlines, such as the Ministry of Health (MOH) Quality Service/Feedback hotline, the National Care Hotline and the Ministry of Social and Family Development (MSF) Hotline. Following this, the police announced that they had begun an investigation on both Koh and Ng for allegedly instigating others to call and overwhelm public hotlines. Koh later apologised for her actions and claimed that she was assisting police with the investigations.

In November 2021, multiple videos from Koh's YouTube channel, where she uploaded various videos surrounding the pandemic and the vaccine, were removed after they were found to have been violating community guidelines. The removal of content from her channel was supported by the Ministry of Health. Following this, Koh decided to sue the government over the removal of her videos, as she believed that it was a violation of her human rights. She was represented by lawyer and activist M Ravi, who was a friend of hers.

On 15 March 2022, Koh released a Facebook post claiming that she had tested positive for COVID-19 several days after her husband had tested positive, and that she was having mild symptoms. She stated that she believed that since she had contracted the virus, she possessed "immunity for life" from the virus.

== Legal issues ==
In January 2022, the Ministry of Health filed a police report against Koh after she reportedly encouraged members of Healing the Divide to "overwhelm on-site medical staff with questions" at vaccination centres on 27 December 2021.

As of 9 May 2024, one of the charges was dismissed, and five new charges were handed to her by the courts, for instigating her followers to harass doctors and to obstruct workers at the MOH and the MSF from performing their duties during the pandemic. Koh had a total of 14 charges against her.

In 2023, Koh and M.Ravi were investigated by the police for allegedly violating the rule against social media posts during the cooling off period of the 2023 Singaporean presidential election after they were reported by the Singapore Elections Department for posting videos "intended to promote or prejudice the electoral success of a candidate or to otherwise enhance or prejudice the standing of a candidate". The Cooling Off Day is a campaign silence period where campaigning and election advertising are prohibited to "let voters reflect rationally on various issues raised at an election before going to the polls."

Koh and her husband have mounted several cases against people or entities for alleged defamation. One of the targets of the defamation lawsuits committed suicide, accusing Koh and her husband of targeting average Singaporeans with lawsuits to drain their financial resources, which resulting in the deceased's financial ruin after multiple lawsuits from them led to ballooning legal fees and severe psychological and physical toll. This led to former Nominated Member of Parliament, Calvin Cheng raising concerns about the need to relook at the legal system to prevent exploitation of a system that disadvantaged people with no time and limited financial resources.

On 25 September 2024, Koh and her husband were ordered to pay the Health Sciences Authority (HSA) $12,000 after the courts found that the couple had abused the court's process in their Judicial Review filing against the HSA, determining that the couple's application disclosed no reasonable cause of action, and were seeking "an academic or hypothetical interpretation of the law" over an investigation that had already been completed.

On 3 December, a district court dismissed a case brought on by the couple in an attempt to ask Cheng to remove what they claimed to be a defamatory post, as well as damages. The court instead found in favour of Cheng and order the couple to pay Cheng costs of S$10,500. In February 2025, Koh and her husband faced a writ of seizure after they failed to pay legal costs from their failed defamation suit against Cheng.

On 16 September, the Attorney-General's Chambers (AGC) declared Koh and her husband to be vexatious litigants who had ""habitually and persistently and without any reasonable ground instituted vexatious legal proceedings" in court against different people". The AGC filed an application in the High Court to require that Koh and Ng need to first seek the court's permission before they begin any new civil proceedings and continue with existing civil proceedings.

==== Collaboration to falsify vaccination records ====
Later that month, Koh was found to have been collaborating with Jipson Quah of the Wan Medical Clinic in Bedok. Quah had been falsifying COVID-19 vaccination records, and allowed patients to submit pre-recorded videos or photos showing them performing a self-administered pre-event antigen rapid test, despite pre-event testing having to occur in real-time and in the presence of a qualified medical practitioner or a qualified self-administered test supervisor. Koh had referred members of Healing the Divide to Quah's clinic. Following this, Koh, Quah, and Quah's assistant Thomas Chua Cheng Soon were arrested. Koh was charged with an offence of the criminal conspiracy to cheat on 23 January 2022. Meanwhile, Quah and Chua were charged with an offence of abetment by conspiracy to cheat, and Quah was suspended from practising as a doctor.

However, before her court hearing, which was scheduled to be on 28 January, Koh was confirmed to have been admitted into the Singapore General Hospital by her lawyer, Clarence Lun. The admission was later revealed to have been caused by a pre-existing thyroid condition. During the hearing, the accusation facing Koh was amended to the more serious charge of being party to a criminal conspiracy with Quah. A requested bail to spend Chinese New Year with her family was also rejected on January 31. This came after it was revealed that at least 20 patients were involved in the vaccination fraud. While in remand, Koh tore up a police statement, which resulted in her being given a new charge of obstructing a police inspector by refusing to sign and tearing up a copy of her statement while in remand.

Koh was granted a $20,000 bail on 4 February 2022, and was released. However, as part of the bail conditions, she could not contact, directly or indirectly, co-accused persons, alleged accomplices or any witnesses, including members of the Healing the Divide. Lun believed that the restriction was overly broad as there were over 6,000 members of Healing the Divide. A list of potential witnesses was later provided.

On 27 July 2022, Koh was handed an additional two charges after new court documents revealed more people had been fraudulently issued certifications of vaccinations as a result of their actions.

On 16 February 2023, Koh was handed an additional six charges: five similar to the past charges plus a sixth for instigating one of the members of her group to fabricate evidence in order to be falsely certified to be of unsound mind.

On 4 March 2025, Koh's social media posts were flagged by posts by the courts as being sub judice. Sub judice is a form of contempt of court and refers to actions that can unduly influence court proceedings. Koh subsequently edited and deleted some of those posts.

Following her release, Koh released a 12-minute video on 8 February to raise $100,000, which she claimed would be use in future court proceedings, and to sue Minister of Health Ong Ye Kung and the government for "judicial review". On 15 February 2022, Koh claimed that she had already managed to raise $96,000, and that all of the money would be converted to crypto assets and kept in a crypto wallet as "safeguarding" from the government.

=== Legal payment ===
Koh had refused to fully pay her lawyers from Fervent Chambers LLC, claiming she had been overcharged. The Supreme Court of Singapore ordered her to pay her lawyers the balance of the $23,000 owed, describing Koh's conduct as “ungracious”.

On 27 January 2023, Fervent Chambers brought her to court over insolvency charges.
