= Lim Soo Hoon =

Singaporean civil servant

Permanent Secretary, Public Service Division, Prime Minister’s Office
- Incumbent
- Assumed office 2005

Permanent Secretary (Finance) (Performance), Ministry of Finance
- In office 2012–2017

Chairman, Accounting and Corporate Regulatory Authority
- Incumbent
- Assumed office 2017

Personal details
- Born: 1959 (age 66–67) Singapore
- Education: University of Adelaide (B.Econ.); Harvard University (M.P.A.)
- Occupation: Civil servant
- Known for: First female Permanent Secretary in Singapore Public Service
- Awards: Public Administration Medal (Silver) (1998); Public Administration Medal (Gold) (2004)

Lim Soo Hoon (Chinese: 林秀勋) is the first female Permanent Secretary of Singapore in the Public Service Division of the office of the Prime Minister of Singapore. Lim held other high-profile positions at Singapore's Ministry of Trade and Industry, then later into positions in Singapore's Ministry of Transport, and then in the Ministry of Manpower, and Ministry of Community Development, Youth and Sports. Lim became Singapore's Woman of the Year in 1997.

Lim was awarded the Silver Public Administration Medal in 1998 and the Gold Public Administration Medal in 2004.

Lim has served in the public sector for 36 years, her final position being the Permanent Secretary at the Ministry of Finance before retirement.

Lim will continue working as chairman of the Accounting and Corporate Regulatory Authority (Acra) Board.
