= German Type UE submarine =

German Type UE submarine may refer to:

- German Type UE I submarine of WWI
- German Type UE II submarine of WWI
