= Tan Kin Lian =

Singaporean businessman and social activist (born 1948)

Tan Kin Lian PBM BBM
- 陈钦亮
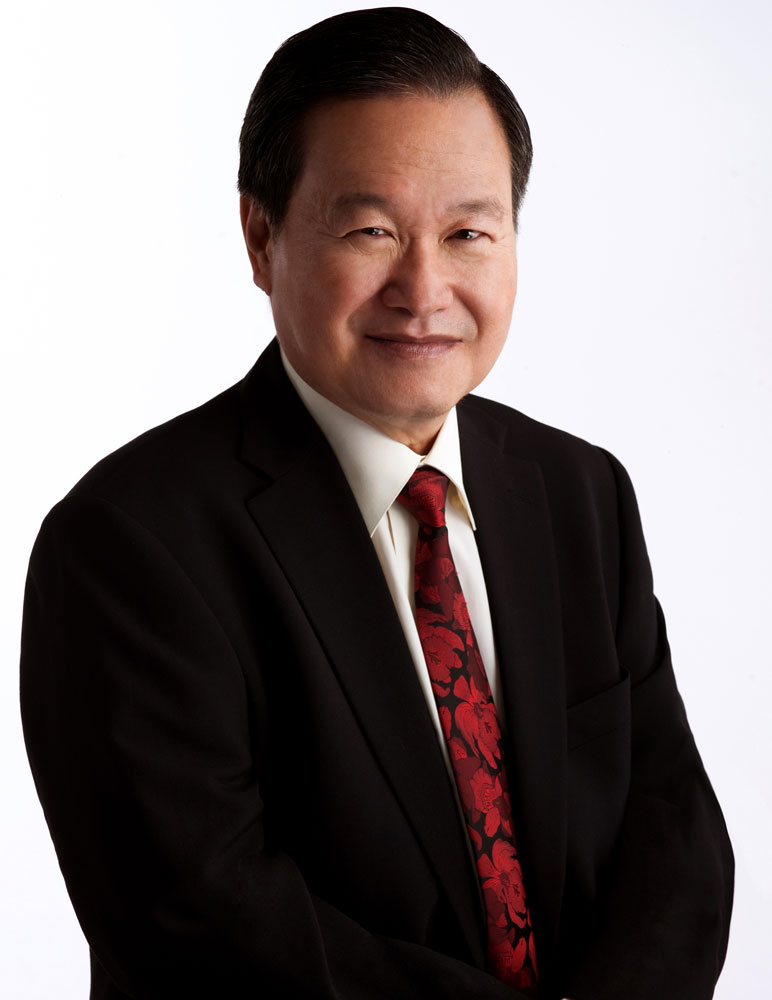
- Born: 9 March 1948 (age 78); Colony of Singapore
- Education: Raffles Institution
- Political party: Independent
- Other political affiliations: People's Action Party (1977–2008)
- Spouse: Tay Siew Hong
- Children: 3
- Website: tankinlian.blogspot.com

Tan Kin Lian (Note: Chinese: 陈钦亮; Pe̍h-ōe-jī: Tân Khim-liāng) PBM BBM (born 9 March 1948) is a Singaporean businessman who served as the chief executive officer of NTUC Income between 1977 and 2007.

On 7 June 2011, Tan announced his intention to stand for the presidency in the 2011 presidential election. He was unsuccessful in his bid, losing with 4.91% of the vote to Tony Tan. On 11 August 2023, Tan announced his intention to stand for the presidency again in the 2023 presidential election. He was unsuccessful in his bid, losing with 13.87% of the vote to Tharman Shanmugaratnam.

== Business career ==
=== CEO of NTUC Income ===
Tan began his career as a clerk in an insurance company, before becoming an actuary and subsequently the general manager of NTUC Income in 1977, at the age of 29. He was subsequently re-designated as the chief executive officer and remained in this position until April 2007. Under his leadership, the company grew from having S$28 million in assets in 1977 to more than S$17 billion in assets and over one million policyholders in 2007.

Tan ran NTUC Income with the aim of providing the best value to the policyholders. This meant lower fees for insurance agents, encouragement of direct selling practices which bypassed the agents altogether, and low operating expenses—throughout his 30-year term as CEO, Tan flew in economy class, even on long haul flights. This management style clashed with some of NTUC Income's board members, who preferred the company to be run on a more commercial or professional basis, and even advocated it to be privatised. The board asked Tan to step down after completing his 30-year term at the helm.

=== Other positions ===
Tan's portfolio in 2007 mentioned more than 60 directorships and other corporate appointments. Of these, the most notable was as Chairman of International Co-operative & Mutual Insurance Federation from 1992 to 1997, an international organisation which at that time represented 123 insurance groups in 65 countries, employing 260,000 people. The total assets of the members of this international federation totalled US$1.5 trillion in 1997.

=== Post-retirement interlude ===
Since retiring from NTUC Income in 2007, Tan has provided free financial advice and opinions on current affairs through his blog, and had established the Financial Service Consumer Association (FISCA) to educate people about long-term financial security. During the 2008 financial crisis, he organised public rallies for people who lost their money due to investing in Lehman Brothers' Minibond products. The rallies resulted in a petition to Singapore Government, signed by 983 investors.

He has been active in social media in more recent times, and is especially "active on his public Facebook page which has a following of over 9,000 fans" where he posts regularly on his life as well as on political and social developments. He has also posted extensively on Forest City apartments in Malaysia, having bought a property there, on cost of living issues in Singapore, and on foreign labor in Singapore. Tan also spoke out against the proposed acquisition of NTUC Income by Allianz in 2024, a deal which eventually fell through.

== Political career ==
A former member of the governing People's Action Party (PAP) for 30 years, he left the party in 2008 due to his inactivity, and disagreement with the party's value system. He also served as the party's branch secretary at Marine Parade for three years and was picked by Goh Chok Tong in 1977, to test a pilot scheme for setting up block committees, now known as Residents' Committees (RC).

For the first ten years, Tan was active in Marine Parade constituency but became inactive for the next 20 years, after moving to Upper Thomson and later Yio Chu Kang.

=== 2011 presidential election ===
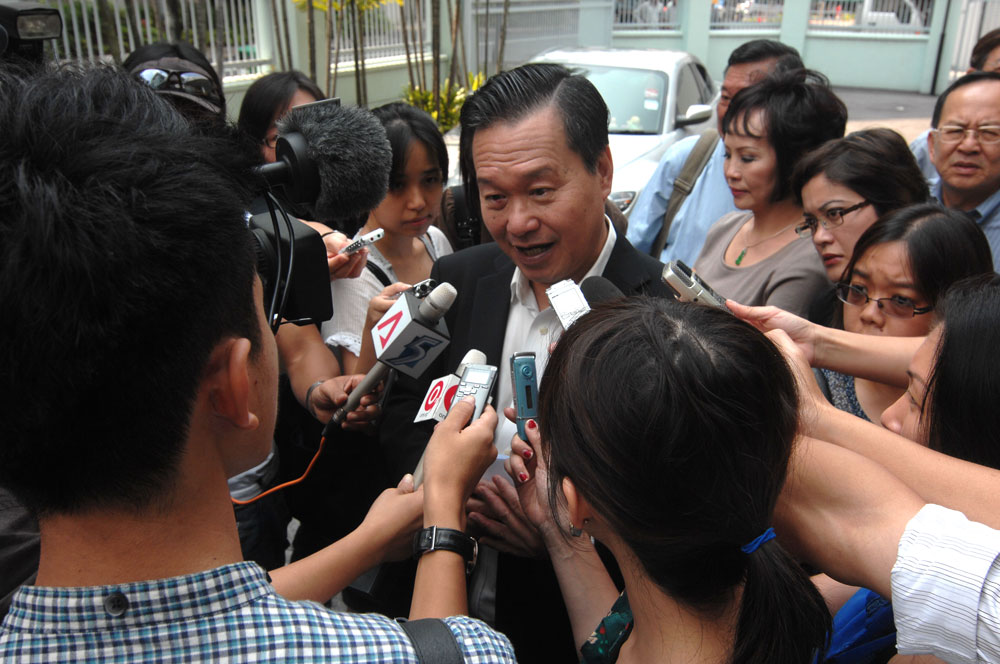
Tan speaking to the media after submitting election forms

Tan had already expressed his interest in becoming the president of Singapore in 2008.

On 7 June 2011, Tan announced that he would be contesting in the 2011 presidential election. Following his announcement, he promised to donate a significant part of the S$4 million presidential salary to a specially formed charity and circulated several statements outlining his position on the role of the president, including a controversial statement on safeguarding the reserves. The statements drew a mild rebuke from senior members of the Singapore Government, who attempted to publicly clarify that the elected president has only "custodial powers" and not "executive powers". In response, Tan issued another statement, where he agreed with the limitations but nevertheless stressed that "the president does not need to be armed with strong executive powers to make an impact. A well qualified and properly elected President will make his impact through the power to persuade, to influence, to counsel, to convey feedback and if necessary, to articulate informed positions on specific issues".

On 7 July 2011, Tan submitted the presidential eligibility forms. Tan had submitted his application for the Certificate of Eligibility under a Special Clause, citing his experience as CEO of an insurance cooperative with a shared capital of S$500 million and assets of S$17 billion. He was granted the Certificate of Eligibility on 11 August 2011 along with the other three candidates.

In an interview with Channel NewsAsia, Tan said that his main reason for running: "Many people said they want voice, they want to be heard. I think I probably represent the person who has got ears to listen and is able to think independently." Tan thinks the role of the elected president should be expanded and suggested, for example, having the president's office produce an annual report detailing the country's reserves.

In response to rumours circulating that Tan would be dropping out of the presidential race early, he refuted such claims and expressed that he would be filing his nomination papers as planned. After submitting his nomination forms on 17 August 2011, he made his nomination day speech in four of the official languages of Singapore; English, Chinese, Malay, and Tamil. He was the only one who did so.

Tan advocated on the need for the burden of National Service (NS) to be shared by all segments of the society, including females and non-citizens.

Tan's symbol is a "Hi-5". He explained "the raised hand signifies willingness to do public service, while the five fingers signify his values of honesty, fairness, positive attitude, courage and public service."

He garnered the lowest number of votes among the four candidates, with 4.91% of the vote. His failure to achieve at least 12.50% of the vote, contributed to his loss of S$48,000 deposits.

=== 2023 presidential election ===
On 8 July 2023, Tan was asked about his plans to re-contest the presidential election. During then, Tan shared that he was still undecided, in part due to his "disheartening" results from the 2011 presidential election.

Tan officially announced on 30 July 2023 that he had submitted his application for a certificate of eligibility for the 2023 Presidential Election. On 11 August, Tan announced his official bid for the presidency. Tan Jee Say, a presidential candidate in the 2011 presidential elections, mentioned during Tan's press conference on 11 August that Tan (would) "make a good president, a courageous, genuine, and humble one." At the time, Tan was reported as saying that he was "somewhat confident" in the elections. He pledged at the time that, if elected, he would raise concerns over areas such as the use of CPF funds and National Service.

Despite some commentators suggesting at the time that Tan may not automatically qualify to run in the election, he was issued the certificate of eligibility on 18 August 2023. On 21 August 2023, Tan was subjected to online criticism after the Association of Women for Action and Research (AWARE) issued a statement on his past track record of making statements on Facebook that were "objectifying women". AWARE questioned why Tan was issued the certificate, to which the Presidential Election Committee stated that they were unaware of his statements prior to issuing him the certificate. Tan also accused the ruling party, the People's Action Party, of being behind what he alleged to be a smear campaign. Tan later removed the social media posts containing the allegation on 23 August 2023. During the election campaign, Tan's original script for his broadcast speech had to be edited as it contained apparent inaccuracies about the role of the President, which Tan did but which he indicated he did not agree with.

On 2 September 2023, results of the election was released. It was revealed that Tan lost the election with the fewest votes. Tan won just 13.87% of the votes but managed to keep his deposit by meeting the minimum threshold of 12.50% of total votes. Tan expected to do "much better" but conceded that the nature of elections is that outcomes are always uncertain. Some have suggested that despite the margin of the loss, Tan can be satisfied in the knowledge that he offered Singaporeans a choice.

== Honours ==
- Singapore:
  - Public Service Medal (1983)
  - Public Service Star (2004)

== Personal life ==
Tan is married to Tay Siew Hong and they have three children together.

He enjoys making puzzles like Sudoku, Logic9 and Shape Quiz, and online games like Family Life and Business Simulation which stimulate creative abilities and teach risk management.

=== Friendship with Ong Teng Cheong ===
Tan was close to Ong Teng Cheong, the fifth president of Singapore. When Ong was elected as president, Tan presented him a set of orchid motif ties in different colours, which were commissioned by NTUC Income and made in the United Kingdom. Ong liked the tie in red color and used it on a number of important occasions, including Nomination Day and his inauguration as the president of Singapore. He also wore it for his presidential portrait which was displayed in government offices and other organisations.

Tan was involved in several initiatives introduced by Ong, such as the Singapore Dance Theatre (SDT), the first Singapore expedition to Mount Everest, and the President's Star Charity. Tan promoted the SDT performances to the policyholders of NTUC Income and later joined the board of directors, where he served for 12 years. NTUC Income became one of the main sponsors of the Mount Everest expedition.

During the last two years of Ong Teng Cheong's term, Tan chaired the President's Star Charity event to raise funds and to promote the Singapore Dress. When Ong's wife died, shortly after the second charity dinner, Tan organised 1,000 messages of condolences from Singaporeans, submitted through the Internet, and presented the book to Ong.
