= Tanglin Community Club =

Community centre in Singapore

Coordinates: 1.3234°N 103.8246°E

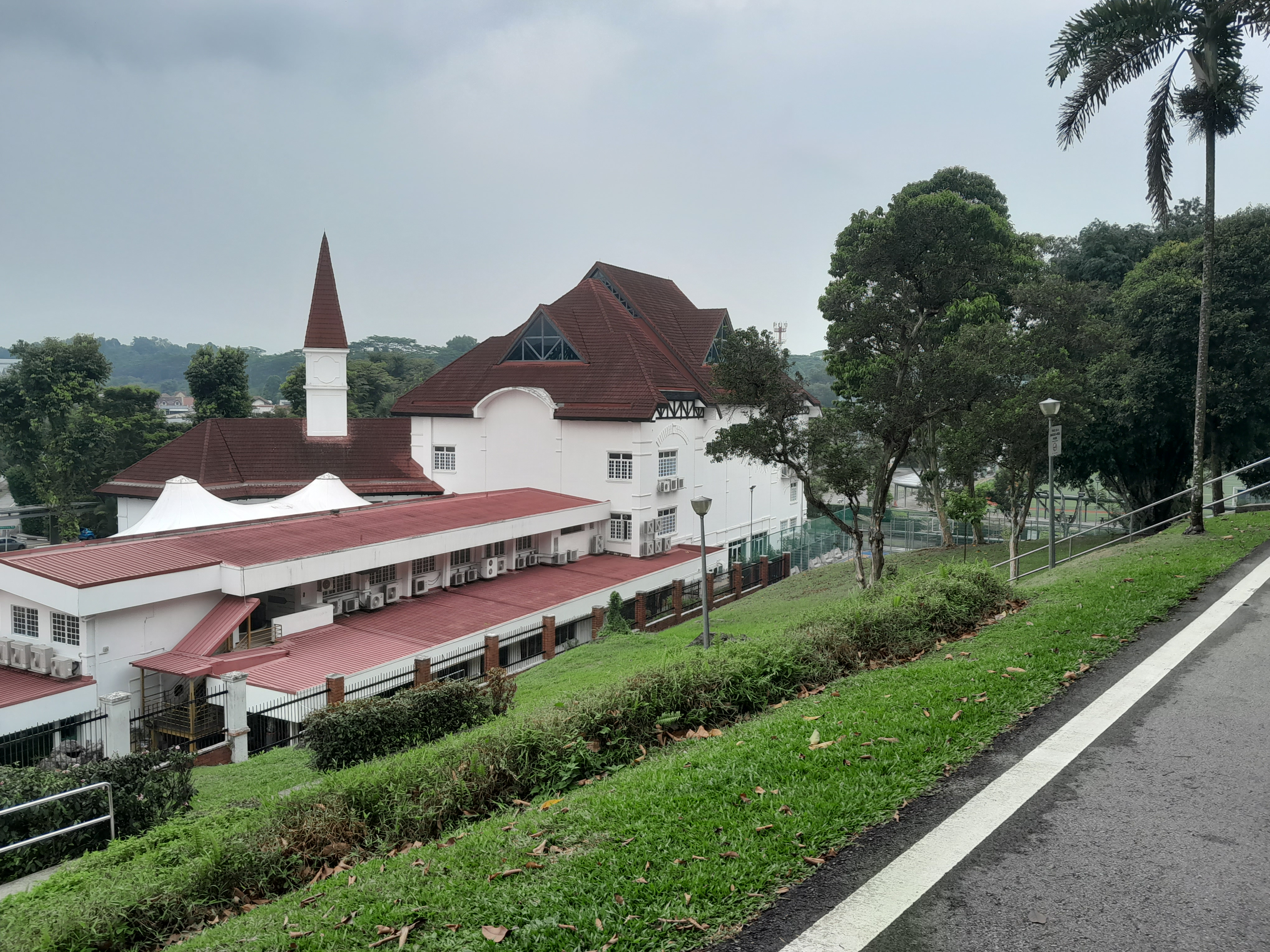
The community centre

Tanglin Community Club is a community centre on the corner of Whitley Road and Malcolm Road in Novena, Singapore.

== History ==
Plans to build a community centre to service the Tanglin area were first announced in 1971. The community centre was completed in 1975, costing over $150,000, and initially held fishing trips to Pulau Tioman in Malaysia. However, by the 1990s, the centre was viewed as old and outdated, and an art sale was held in 1991 to raise funds for an upgrade of the community centre, which would cost over $4.5 million.

The community centre underwent major renovations around by January 1994, with the new design being likened to that of a country club. The new design of the community centre also included a clock tower. The newly renovated community centre reopened in June 1998.
