= United Envirotech =

Engineering company

United Envirotech, Ltd.
- Traded as: SGX: UENV
- Industry: environmental engineering; environmental consulting
- Founded: 2003
- Founders: Lin Yucheng; Goh Ching Wah
- Owners: KKR (~30%, 2015)
- Website: UnitedEnvirotech.com

United Envirotech, Ltd. (UE; UEL) is a company focused on environmental engineering and consulting. Founded in 2003 by Lin Yucheng and Goh Ching Wah, the company went public in 2004 and has been listed on the Singapore stock exchange (UENV) and traded in the United States and Germany.

In 2014 and 2015, news reports indicated that investment firms CITIC Group and Kohlberg Kravis Roberts were jointly seeking to acquire a controlling interest in the company through a newly created joint venture company, tentatively named "CKM".

== Ownership ==
As of 2015, investment company Kohlberg Kravis Roberts owned about 30% of the company based on stock holdings.

As of 2023, its website stated that its major shareholders were CITIC Environment Investment Co Ltd, and China Reform Fund Envirotech Co., Ltd.

== Corporate governance ==
As of 2015, the chairman and chief executive officer of the company was co-founder Lin Yucheng.

According to its website in 2023, its executive chairman was Sun Lei.

== Facilities ==
In 2015, UEL was reported to be constructing a 100,000 litre/day capacity industrial wastewater treatment facility to serve (and with investment from) a petrochemical industrial park situated at the start of the West–East Gas Pipeline in Luntai County, Xinjiang, China.
