= AMP Singapore =

Self-help group in Singapore

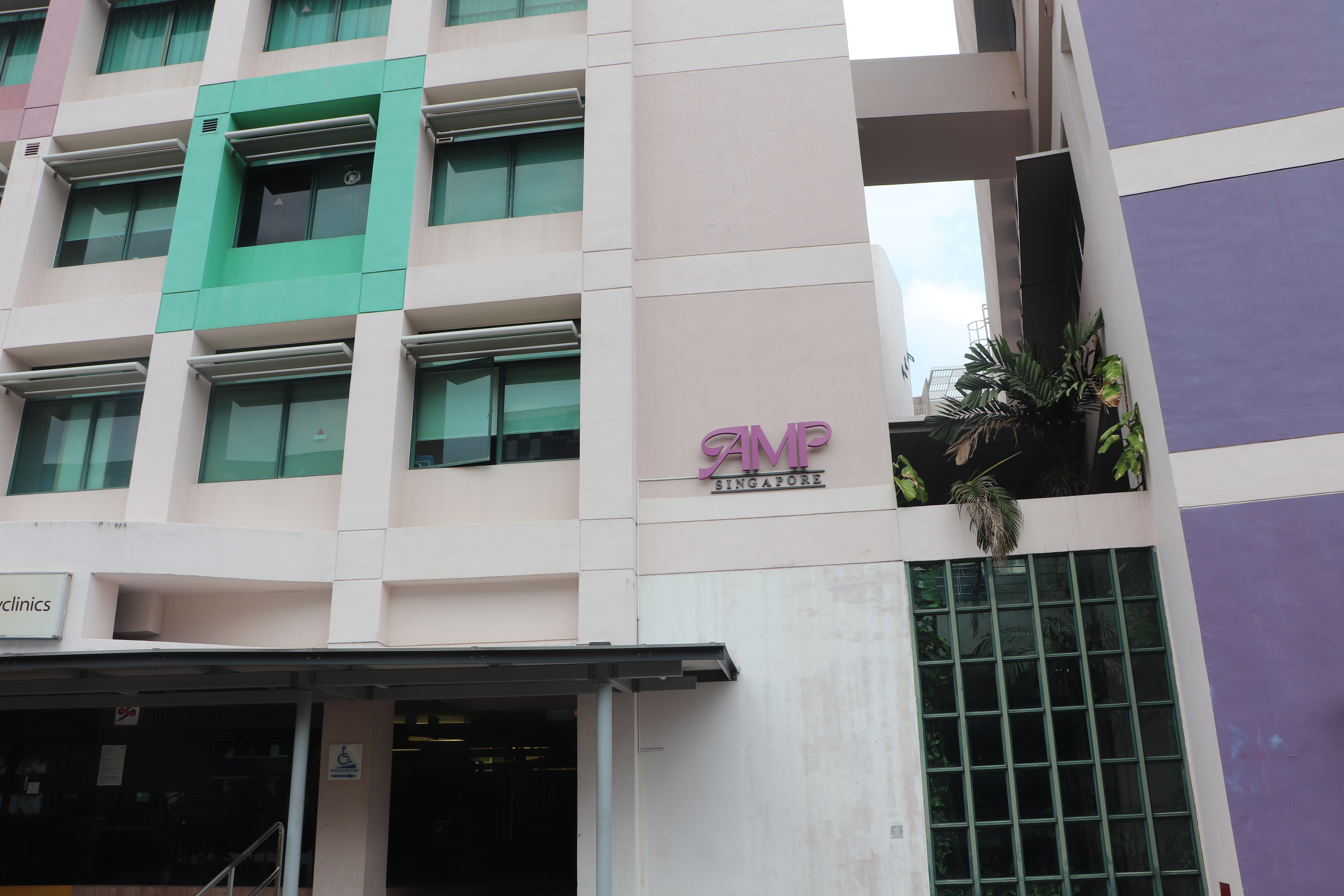
- Association building
- Formation: October 10, 1991; 35 years ago
- Founder: A group of Malay/Muslim professionals
- Type: Nonprofit organization
- Legal status: Association
- Purpose: Counselling through Family Services, Marriage Hub, Training & Education and Youth department
- Headquarters: 1 Pasir Ris Drive 4
- Location: Singapore
- Region served: Muslims in Singapore
- Services: Counselling
- Executive Director: Mohksin Rashid
- Subsidiaries: Centre for Research on Islamic and Malay Affairs, MERCU Learning Point
- Website: amp.org.sg

The AMP Singapore, also known as the Association of Muslim Professionals, is a Singaporean non-profit organisation serving the Muslim community in Singapore. AMP is a registered charitable organisation and is accorded the status of an Institution of Public Character.

AMP offers programmes and services for various demographics and those in need of counselling services. It offers this through its Family Services, Marriage Hub, Training & Education and Youth departments.

== History ==
There had been unease in the Malay/Muslim community in Singapore since the mid-1980s. The population census in 1980 showed that the community was overrepresented in areas such as unemployment, drug addiction, and divorce, and not performing well in areas such as education and socioeconomic development. It was during this tumultuous period that a group of Malay/Muslim professionals felt that something urgent needed to be done to provide some direction to the community. They then decided on a convention as the most ideal platform to share their thoughts and plans to promote the progress and development of the community.

In October 1990, a group of Malay/Muslim professionals gathered in a two-day convention to set up Association of Muslim Professionals as a non-political association. A pro-tem committee was set up to lay the groundworks for establishing the association. Intended to be a non-profit organisation and not as a private sector rival to Yayasan Mendaki, the association was established on 10 October 1991 and launched by then-Prime Minister Goh Chok Tong on 31 October 1991. As part of its establishment, the association launched a charity fund aiming to raise $1 million a year.

== Subsidiaries ==
AMP has two wholly owned subsidiaries and a youth wing: a full-fledged research centre, Centre for Research on Islamic and Malay Affairs (RIMA), a provider of child and youth education, MERCU Learning Point and Young AMP.

=== Centre for Research on Islamic and Malay Affairs ===
Formerly the research division of AMP, the Centre for Research on Islamic and Malay Affairs (RIMA) was converted into a full-fledged research centre in February 1998. Its purpose is to undertake research to provide leadership in Malay and Muslim affairs. RIMA conducts research programmes in a number of key areas, which include economics, education, religion, social, leadership and civil society.

=== MERCU Learning Point ===
MERCU Learning Point is a private education centre that offers a range of programmes and services for children aged 2 months to 12 years. Its network comprises nine childcare centres, six school-based student care centres and two kindergarten care centres, including an enrichment wing. It prides in establishing a collaborative environment with parents and schools as important catalysts in the children's development. With the tagline Starting Young, Aiming High, its programmes are robustly designed to maximise the children's capabilities and propel them to greater heights. MERCU serves about 2,000 children every month at its 17 centres located island wide in Singapore.

=== Young AMP ===
The youth wing of AMP, Young AMP, organizes seminars and workshops to encourage critical thinking among youths, equip them with skills and knowledge aimed at developing their capacity to the future leaders of the community, as well as expose them to other relevant issues at the national and global levels.

== Signature Programmes ==
=== Adopt a Family & Youth Scheme ===
The Adopt a Family & Youth Scheme provides holistic assistance to low-income families. It was introduced in 1999 to encourage self-reliance within disadvantaged families. Under the scheme, families are assisted through financial assistance and management, economic empowerment, socio-educational and parental education programmes, and family life skills workshops.

=== Debt Advisory Centre ===
The Debt Advisory Centre (DAC), which was launched in 2013, is a one-stop centre that assists individuals facing debt problems through a three-pronged approach: advice, educate and research. It provides a roadmap for debtors to have a clearer picture of the options that are available to them.

The DAC is open to individuals from all races and religious affiliations, who are facing debt problems.

=== Development & Reintegration Programme ===
The Development & Reintegration Programme was introduced in 2018 to assist offenders and their families through an individualised intervention plan, in-care and aftercare engagements, and financial and socio-educational assistance.

== Board of directors ==
Notable former board members of AMP include Saktiandi Supaat, Member of Parliament for Bishan-Toa Payoh GRC; Zhulkarnain Abdul Rahim, Member of Parliament for Chua Chu Kang GRC; Azmoon Ahmad, former Nominated Member of Parliament and Mohd Ismail Hussein, also a former Nominated Member of Parliament.

AMP's current chairman is Dr. Md Badrun Nafis Saion, a Specialist in Paediatric Dentistry at Q & M Dental Care. He has been chairman of the association since 2019 and has been a board member of AMP since 2014. He was concurrently the chairman of the Nominating and Fund Raising committees of AMP.

AMP's vice-chairman is Mr. Hazni Aris, an Assistant Vice President for Business Development with Tokio Marine Life. He is also President of Young AMP, the youth wing of AMP. He has been a board member of AMP since 2017 and is concurrently the chairman of the Media & Relations Resource Panel of AMP.
