= Accounting and Corporate Regulatory Authority =

Statutory board under ministry of finance in Singapore

Statutory board overview
- Formed: 1 April 2004; 22 years ago
- Preceding agencies: Registry of Companies and Businesses; Public Accountants’ Board
- Jurisdiction: Government of Singapore
- Headquarters: 55 Newton Road, #03-02 Revenue House, Singapore 307987
- Statutory board executives: Ong Chong Tee, Chairman; Chia-Tern Huey Min, Chief Executive
- Parent Statutory board: Ministry of Finance (Singapore)
- Website: www.acra.gov.sg
- Agency ID: T08GB0001G

The Accounting and Corporate Regulatory Authority (ACRA) is a statutory board under the Ministry of Finance of the Government of Singapore. ACRA is the regulator of business registration, financial reporting, public accountants and corporate service providers. ACRA is also responsible for developing the accountancy sector and setting the accounting standards for companies, charities co-operative societies, and societies in Singapore.

== History ==
ACRA was formed on 1 April 2004 by the Accounting and Corporate Regulatory Act, which resulted in the merger of the then Registry of Companies and Businesses (RCB), and the Public Accountants’ Board (PAB). The merger was to synergise the monitoring of companies’ compliance with disclosure requirements, and the regulation of public accountants performing statutory audit.

=== Refreshed Bizfile portal (2024) ===
On 9 December 2024, ACRA launched a revamped version of its Bizfile portal. The portal provides the public with access to various registry filing and business information services. According to ACRA, the key features of the revamped portal included "user-centric design and intuitive navigation features", "enhanced data integrity and governance", and "strengthened personal data protection".

On 12 December 2024, journalist Bertha Henson raised concerns about the functionality on the revamped Bizfile portal which appeared to allow users to retrieve the National Registration Identity Card (NRIC) numbers of individuals by name. Investigations by local news outlets determined that the NRIC numbers of many individuals, including well-known public figures, were accessible via this functionality without authentication or payment.

This raised concerns amongst the public because in 2019, the Personal Data Protection Commission of Singapore (PDPC) had issued guidelines highlighting that NRICs were sensitive in nature, and recommending that organisations avoid collecting, using, or disclosing NRIC numbers where possible.

In an article published in July 2019, the PDPC had explained that "indiscriminate collection or negligent handling of NRIC numbers can increase the risk of unintended disclosure and may result in NRIC numbers being used for illegal activities such as identity theft or fraud".

On 14 December 2024, the functionality allowing retrieval of NRIC numbers of individuals by name was disabled. ACRA explained that the functionality had been in line with a forthcoming broader government shift away from the use of masked NRIC numbers, and apologised for providing the functionality "before public education on the appropriate use of NRIC information could be done". The Ministry of Digital Development and Information also released a statement stating that there should "not be any sensitivity in having one's full NRIC number made public" since a NRIC number is a unique identifier and "is assumed to be known, just as our real names are known".

== Overview ==
The Accounting and Corporate Regulatory Authority (ACRA) is the regulator of business registration, financial reporting, public accountants and corporate service providers. ACRA's role is to monitor corporate compliance with disclosure requirements and regulation of public accountants performing statutory audit.

== Management ==
Date	Name	Remarks
1 April 2004 - 31 January 2013	Juthika Ramanathan	
1 February 2013 - 31 March 2017	Kenneth Yap	
1 April 2017 - 21 April 2024	Ong Khiaw Hong	
22 April 2024 – present	Chia-Tern Huey Min	

== See also ==
- List of company registers
- Inland Revenue Authority of Singapore
- Goods & Service Tax Singapore
- Income tax in Singapore
- List of financial supervisory authorities by country
