= Leo Yip =

Singaporean civil servant

Leo Yip PJG PPA(E) PPA(P) PBS

Head of the Civil Service
- In office 1 September 2017 – 1 April 2026
- Prime Minister: Lee Hsien Loong; Lawrence Wong
- Preceded by: Peter Ong
- Succeeded by: Chan Heng Kee

Permanent Secretary (Strategy), Prime Minister's Office
- In office 1 September 2017 – 1 April 2026
- Prime Minister: Lee Hsien Loong; Lawrence Wong
- Preceded by: Peter Ong
- Succeeded by: Chan Heng Kee

Permanent Secretary (National Security Intelligence and Coordination), Prime Minister's Office
- In office 1 May 2016 – 30 November 2025
- Prime Minister: Lee Hsien Loong; Lawrence Wong
- Preceded by: Benny Lim Siang Hoe
- Succeeded by: Chan Heng Kee

Permanent Secretary (Home Affairs)
- In office 1 December 2014 – 31 August 2017
- Minister: Teo Chee Hean; K. Shanmugam
- Preceded by: Tan Tee How
- Succeeded by: Pang Kin Keong

Chairman of the Economic Development Board
- In office 1 July 2009 – 30 November 2014
- Preceded by: Lim Siong Guan
- Succeeded by: Beh Swan Gin

Permanent Secretary (Manpower)
- In office 1 July 2005 – 30 September 2009
- Minister: Ng Eng Hen; Gan Kim Yong
- Preceded by: Yong Ying-I
- Succeeded by: Loh Khum Yean

Personal details
- Born: 1963 (age 62–63)
- Education: Harvard Kennedy School (MPA); University of Warwick (MBA); University of Cambridge (BA)
- Police career
- Department: Singapore Police Force
- Service years: 1982–2000
- Rank: Senior Assistant Commissioner of Police

Leo Yip Seng Cheong PJG PPA(E) PPA(P) PBS (Chinese: 叶成昌; pinyin: Yè Chéngchāng; born 1963) is a Singaporean retired civil servant and police officer. He served as Head of the Civil Service, the highest-ranking official in the Singapore civil service, from 2017 to 2026. He also served as permanent secretary at the Ministry of Home Affairs and the Ministry of Manpower, and Chairman of the Economic Development Board.

== Early life and education ==
Yip was born in 1963, and studied at St Joseph's Institution and Catholic Junior College. In 1982, he was awarded a Singapore Police Force Overseas Scholarship to pursue his undergraduate studies.

Yip completed a Bachelor of Arts in economics at the University of Cambridge in 1985, attaining second class (upper) honours. He then completed a Master of Business Administration at the University of Warwick. From 1993 to 1994, Yip received a postgraduate scholarship to complete a Master of Public Administration at the Harvard Kennedy School.

== Civil service career ==
=== Police career ===
Yip began his career with the Singapore Police Force. His foundational postings included being an investigation officer, Head of Operations at one of the SPF's land divisions, and a staff officer in the Criminal Investigation Department (CID). From 1989 to 1993, he served as head of the CID's intelligence division.

On Yip's return from Harvard Kennedy School, Yip was appointed commander of Clementi Police Division. He later held senior positions in SPF headquarters as Director (Planning and Organisation) and Director (Operations). He was promoted to the rank of Senior Assistant Commissioner of Police in July 1999, before departing the police in 2000.

=== Administrative Service ===
After departing the police, Yip was appointed Principal Private Secretary to Senior Minister and Singapore's founding prime minister Lee Kuan Yew in 2000. In 2002, he was appointed Deputy Secretary in the Ministry of Manpower (MOM), holding an additional portfolio of Chief Executive at Singapore Workforce Development Agency (WDA) from 2003. In 2005, he was promoted to Permanent Secretary in MOM. In the latter role, he was conferred the Public Administration Medal (Gold), one of the highest honours awarded to public servants in Singapore.

In 2009, Yip was appointed chairman of the Economic Development Board, a high-profile statutory board. Previous chairmen of EDB include Lim Siong Guan, a former Head of Civil Service, and Philip Yeo, a prominent civil servant. Yip served as chairman until November 2014, when he was appointed Permanent Secretary at the Ministry of Home Affairs. On 1 May 2016, he was appointed to concurrent positions as the Permanent Secretary (Prime Minister's Office) and Permanent Secretary (National Security and Intelligence Coordination), being responsible for the National Security Coordination Secretariat in the latter role.

=== Head of Civil Service ===
On 18 July 2017, it was announced that Yip would succeed Peter Ong as Head of the Civil Service, the most senior position in the Singapore civil service. He also took on Ong's portfolio as Permanent Secretary (Strategy) in the Prime Minister's Office, and retained the post of Permanent Secretary (National Security and Intelligence Coordination). He was the first former police officer to become Head of the Civil Service. Yip took on the position on 1 September 2017, relinquishing his appointment in the Ministry of Home Affairs the same day. In 2018, he was conferred the Meritorious Service Medal for his "distinguished contributions to Singapore" across his civil service career. On 1 December 2025, he relinquished his portfolio as Permanent Secretary (National Security and Intelligence Coordination) while retaining his other positions.

On 18 July 2023, Yip sent a message to public servants in response to several recent major political scandals, referring to the S. Iswaran corruption case, the resignations of Members of Parliament Tan Chuan-Jin and Cheng Li Hui over an extramarital affair, and various misconduct allegations over cabinet ministers Vivian Balakrishnan and K. Shanmugam renting out properties on Ridout Road. Yip said that the incidents had a left many civil servants disillusioned and angered, and negatively affected their morale. He urged officers to voice concerns to their senior leadership, while emphasising that the events would not affect the civil service's work, stating that civil servants "have nothing to fear so long as they act professionally and with integrity."

==== COVID-19 pandemic ====
Yip led the civil service during the COVID-19 pandemic. He chaired the planning group on vaccines and therapeutics, which took vaccine recommendations from another expert panel and identified "strategic bets" on which to introduce into Singapore. Yip said the group "leveraged" the Economic Development Board's "strong relationships" with several pharmaceutical companies developing vaccines, including Pfizer, Moderna, and BioNTech. Non-disclosure agreements were signed with these companies "gave Singapore access to confidential data on the progress of the vaccines." Singapore's COVID-19 vaccination campaign achieved a 92% vaccination rate by 2021, one of the highest in the world.

Yip has identified "partnership between Government and people" as an important facet of Singapore's response to COVID-19, particularly Singaporeans' spirit of mutual care and collaboration to help those in need. In 2022, he also opined that the pandemic had illustrated the importance of leadership in government.

==== Bizfile review ====
In January 2025, Yip was named head of a panel reviewing the unmasking of National Registration Identity Card (NRIC) numbers on Bizfile, a business portal which had been launched by the Accounting and Corporate Regulatory Authority (ACRA). From 9 to 13 December 2024, full NRIC numbers were publicly accessible by search on the portal, triggering a significant political backlash. The function was disabled after over 500,000 searches had been made, leading to a public apology by Josephine Teo, the Minister for Digital Development and Information.

The panel's report, issued on 3 March 2025, concluded that there was no "deliberate wrongdoing or wilful inaction" on the part of ACRA and the Ministry of Digital Development and Information. However, the report found the two organisations responsible for six "shortcomings" that led to the incident, and expressed that the performance of the civil service in the case was not "to the level we set for ourselves." It suggested that further investigations would be conducted into the roles individual officers played and their degrees of responsibility.

=== Retirement ===
On 9 March 2026, it was announced that Yip would retire from the civil service on 1 April. He would be succeeded by Chan Heng Kee in his portfolios as Head of the Civil Service and Permanent Secretary (Strategy) in the Prime Minister's Office. Minister for Defence and Coordinating Minister for Public Services Chan Chun Sing expressed gratitude for Yip's "exemplary leadership and extensive contributions", calling him "instrumental in charting new direction, pushing boundaries, and strengthening capabilities in the public service." Upon his retirement, Yip joined the National University of Singapore Board of Trustees as deputy chairman.

== Awards and decorations ==
- Public Administration Medal (Silver), 1997.
- Long Service Award, 2007.
- Public Administration Medal (Gold), 2008.
- Meritorious Service Medal, 2018.
