= Pang Kin Keong =

Singaporean civil servant

Pang Kin Keong PJG PJG(COVID-19) PPA(E) PPA(P) PBS
- 彭建强
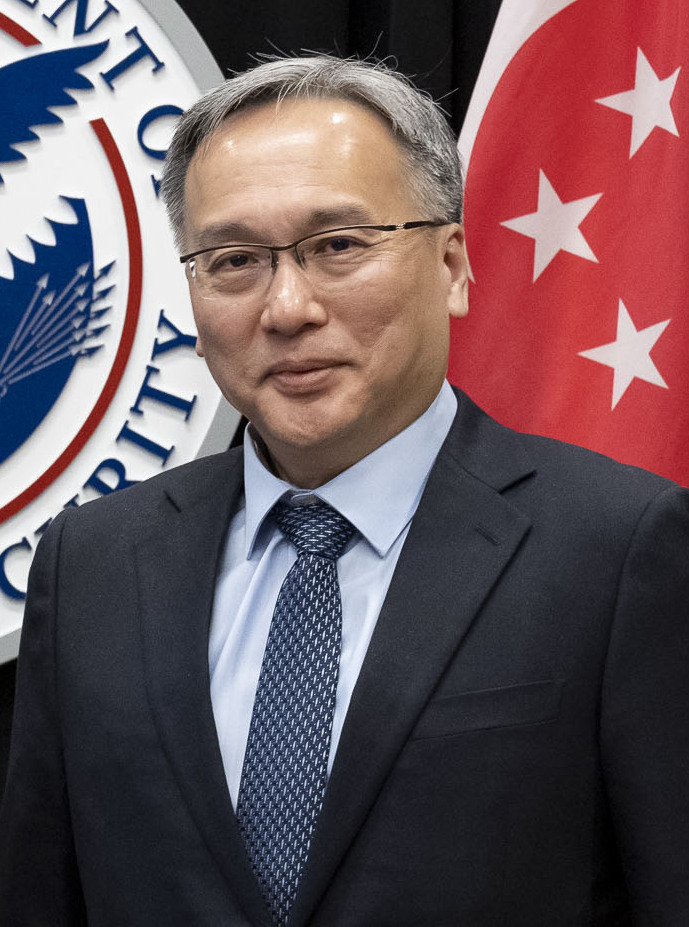
- Pang in 2023

Permanent Secretary (Home Affairs)
- In office 1 September 2017 – 1 June 2026
- Minister: K. Shanmugam
- Preceded by: Leo Yip
- Succeeded by: Tan Chye Hee

Permanent Secretary (Transport)
- In office 1 July 2012 – 31 August 2017
- Minister: Lui Tuck Yew; Khaw Boon Wan
- Preceded by: Choi Shing Kwok
- Succeeded by: Loh Ngai Seng

Permanent Secretary (Law)
- In office 1 September 2010 – 30 June 2012
- Minister: K. Shanmugam
- Preceded by: Chan Lai Fung
- Succeeded by: Beh Swan Gin

Director of the Internal Security Department
- In office 2004 – 2010
- Minister: Wong Kan Seng
- Preceded by: Benny Lim Siang Hoe
- Succeeded by: Loh Ngai Seng

Personal details
- Born: 1966 (age 59–60) Singapore
- Education: École nationale supérieure d'ingénieurs électriciens de Grenoble (BEng); London Business School (MSc)

Pang Kin Keong PJG PJG (COVID-19) PPA(E) PPA(P) PBS (Chinese: 彭建强; pinyin: Péng Jiànqiáng; born 1966) is a Singaporean retired senior civil servant. He served as Permanent Secretary of the Ministry of Home Affairs from 2017 to 2026, the Transport from 2012 to 2017, and the Law from 2010 to 2012. He also served as Director of the Internal Security Department from 2004 to 2010.

== Early life and career ==
Born in 1966, Pang was awarded a Public Service Commission scholarship. He studied for six years in France, including one year studying French before gaining admittance to the École nationale supérieure d'ingénieurs électriciens de Grenoble. He graduated with a bachelor's degree in electrical engineering.

Pang began his career in the Public Service Division, Prime Minister's Office, before earning another scholarship to complete a Master's degree at London Business School. He was appointed to the elite Administrative Service in 1993, and served in the Ministry of Trade and Industry (MTI) as Director of the Trade Division and Deputy Secretary (Special Projects). He also served as Press Secretary to then-Deputy Prime Minister Lee Hsien Loong. Between 2000 and 2004, Pang served as Principal Private Secretary to then-Prime Minister Goh Chok Tong.

== Senior civil servant ==
=== Internal Security Department ===
From 2004 to 2010, Pang served as Director of the Internal Security Department (ISD), Singapore's main national security and domestic intelligence agency. For his work at the ISD, Pang received the Public Administration Medal (Silver) in 2007.

==== Mas Selamat Kastari escape ====
During Pang's tenure, Jemaah Islamiyah terrorist Mas Selamat Kastari, detained under the Internal Security Act, escaped from ISD's Whitley Road Detention Centre on 27 February 2008. The escape triggered a massive manhunt involving the Singapore Police Force and the Singapore Armed Forces. The escape also elicited a strong public reaction, and compelled Deputy Prime Minister and Minister for Home Affairs Wong Kan Seng to deliver a public apology, who stated that "this should never have happened" and that "an independent investigation is under way."

Pang's career was not affected by the escape. However, a Committee of Inquiry's findings led to nine ISD officers being "sacked or disciplined" after the committee judged that a security lapse had occurred. On 8 May 2009, it was announced that Mas Selamat had been re-arrested in Malaysia following a joint operation between Singapore and Malaysia in Johor. On 24 September 2010, he was transferred back to Singapore custody.

In a 2014 interview, Pang confessed that he was heavily demoralised by the escape and the public criticism which followed it. He stated, "when I read the newspapers or my email, (I felt) like slumping and going back to bed, under the covers." Pang was also concerned that he would be moved out of the ISD before Mas Selamat could be recaptured, stating that he "wanted at least to be able to say, yes, the mistake happened under me, but I rectified it under my watch as well." Pang also credited his family's support during this period as having influenced his subsequent leadership style.

=== Ministry of Law ===
On 1 September 2010, Pang left the Internal Security Department, and was appointed Permanent Secretary at the Ministry of Law. While at the ministry, Pang supported efforts to develop Singapore as an "international hub for arbitration and legal services" and "intellectual property services."

=== Ministry of Transport ===
After 22 months at the Ministry of Law, Pang was moved to the Ministry of Transport as permanent secretary on 1 July 2012. During five years at the ministry, Pang was credited with leading several key programmes such as Changi Airport's fifth terminal, and planning for the Tuas megaport. Pang described his main concern at the ministry as "the stress his officers were facing", partly owing to "intense public pressure" stemming from a series of Mass Rapid Transit train breakdowns. He directed that the ministry's Human Resource division be placed under his direct supervision, in an effort to signal the importance of personnel welfare and directly influence HR policies.

On 12 August 2015, Pang gave an "unplanned speech" at a Ministry of Transport gala dinner, where he lauded his outgoing Minister Lui Tuck Yew. Lui had decided to retire from politics at that year's general election, having come under intense public pressure over several high-profile Mass Rapid Transit (MRT) service disruptions and other issues in Singapore's transport system. Pang praised Lui's “direct, straight-talking and principled” manner, and defended Lui's record on public transportation. He argued that it was an "incontrovertible fact" that the reliability of rail services had "seen continuous and marked improvement" during Lui's tenure.

Pang has emphasised vehicular automation during his tenure. He identified it as an appropriate policy response to Singapore's manpower shortage stemming from demographics changes. In 2015, he unveiled Singapore's transport plans with "driverless buses along roads and freeways populated by platoons of autonomous trucks following a single driver." Pang identified Singapore's "limited land and workforce" as motivations for automated transport, stating that transport operators "are not some of the professions which Singaporeans aspire to."

In 2016, the Ministry of Transport also led a multi-agency committee to begin trialling 25 Unmanned Aerial Systems, which Pang extolled as possessing "many potential applications and use[s]." Later that year, Singapore introduced its first driverless taxi in a "limited public trial." As chairman of the Committee on Autonomous Road Transport in Singapore (CARTS), Pang secured a Memorandum of Understanding with Scania AB and Toyota Tsusho in January 2017 to develop an autonomous truck platooning system.

=== Ministry of Home Affairs ===
On 1 September 2017, Pang succeeded Leo Yip as Permanent Secretary at the Ministry of Home Affairs (MHA). As Permanent Secretary, Pang was appointed to the newly created Sentencing Advisory Panel in 2022, which was tasked with producing a set of sentencing guidelines to improve transparency to the public on sentencing standards in court cases.

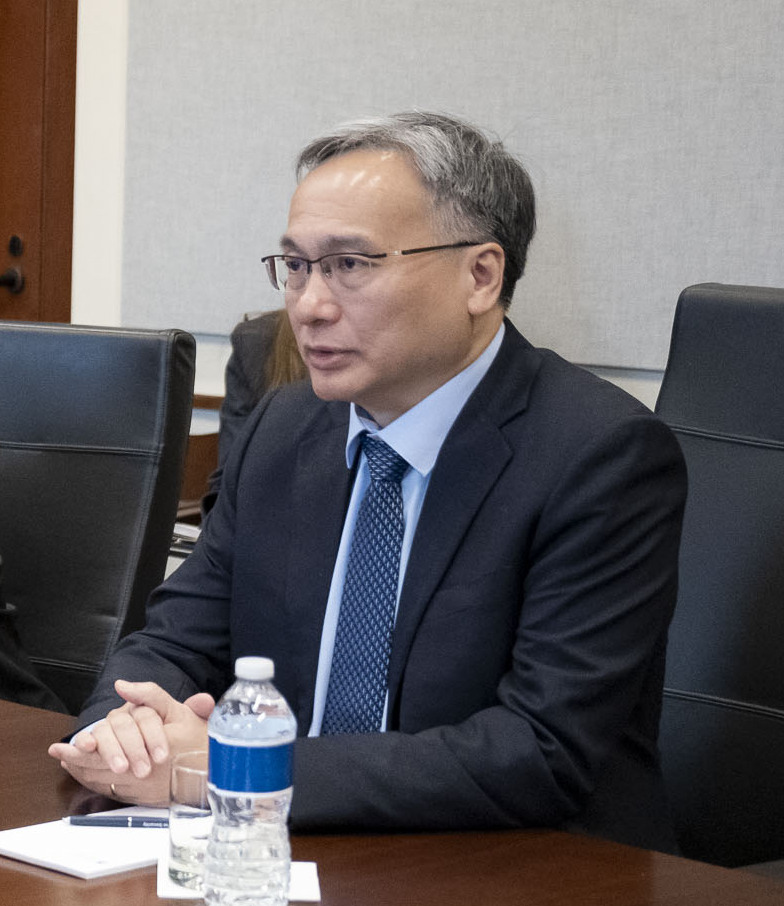
Pang on a visit to Washington, D.C., 2023

Pang played a significant role in the Singapore government's response to the COVID-19 pandemic. As Permanent Secretary (Home Affairs), Pang was ex officio chairman of the Homefront Crisis Executive Group (HCEG), which coordinates a Whole-of-Government response to national crises. The HCEG was activated for more than two and a half years, during which Pang coordinated the entire civil service's pandemic response. In an official citation, the government credited Pang:

It was in large part due to his leadership, that the Singapore public service was able to anticipate many of the challenges during the crisis, respond swiftly and effectively to a complex threat, and generally stay ahead of this tricky pandemic.

When special national honours were conferred following the pandemic to public servants, Pang was one of three individuals honoured the top honour given, the Meritorious Service Medal.

On 16 April 2026, it was announced that Pang would be retiring from the Administrative Service on 1 June.

== Other activities ==
In 2017, Pang joined Mediacorp's Board of Directors. He also serves on the Board of Governors for the S. Rajaratnam School of International Studies, Nanyang Technological University.

Pang is married and has two daughters.

== Awards and decorations ==
- Public Administration Medal (Silver), 2001.
- Public Administration Medal (Gold), 2007.
- Long Service Medal, 2016.
- Meritorious Service Medal (COVID-19), 2022.
- Meritorious Service Medal, 2024.

Government offices
Preceded by Leo Yip	Permanent Secretary (Home Affairs); 2017 – 2026	Succeeded by Tan Chye Hee
Preceded by Choi Shing Kwok	Permanent Secretary (Transport); 2012 – 2017	Succeeded by Loh Ngai Seng
Preceded by Chan Lai Fung	Permanent Secretary (Law); 2010 – 2012	Succeeded by Beh Swan Gin
Preceded by Benny Lim Siang Hoe	Director, Internal Security Department; 2004 – 2010	Succeeded by Loh Ngai Seng
