= Bobby Chin =

Singaporean accountant

Bobby Chin Yoke Choong DUBC PJG BBM PBM

Chairman of the Housing and Development Board
- In office 1 October 2016 – 31 March 2023
- Preceded by: James Koh Cher Siang
- Succeeded by: Benny Lim Siang Hoe

Chairman of the Tote Board
- In office 1 January 2006 – 31 December 2011
- Preceded by: Yeo Ning Hong
- Succeeded by: Moses Lee Kim Poo

Chairman of the Urban Redevelopment Authority
- In office 1 April 2001 – 31 March 2006
- Preceded by: Khoo Cheng Lim
- Succeeded by: Alan Chan

Personal details
- Born: 1952 (age 73–74)
- Spouse: Hooi Lai Ngarn
- Education: University of Singapore (BAcc)

Chinese name
- Traditional Chinese: 陳育寵
- Simplified Chinese: 陈育宠
Transcriptions
Standard Mandarin
- Hanyu Pinyin: Chén Yùchǒng
- IPA: [ʈʂʰə̌n.ŷ.ʈʂʰʊ̀ŋ]

Bobby Chin Yoke Choong (Note: Chinese: see Chinese name and romanisations) DUBC PJG BBM PBM (born c. 1952) is a Singaporean accountant and served as chairman of the Urban Redevelopment Authority (2001–2006), Tote Board (2006–2011), NTUC FairPrice (2014–2022) and the Housing and Development Board (2016–2023).

From 2010 to 2020, Chin was a member of the Council of Presidential Advisers, serving presidents S. R. Nathan, Tony Tan and Halimah Yacob. Chin also served as director of Yeo Hiap Seng, OCBC Bank, Neptune Orient Lines, Singtel and Temasek.

== Early life and education ==
In 1952, Bobby Chin Yoke Choong was born. His father worked at a cinema as a cashier, and his family lived in a staff quarters behind the cinema.

In 1974, Chin graduated from the University of Singapore with a Bachelor of Accountancy. Subsequently, Chin was a fellow Chartered Accountant of Singapore and an associate member of the Institute of Chartered Accountants in England and Wales.

== Career ==
=== Accountancy career ===
Upon graduation, Chin worked in Peat Marwick Mitchell & Company as an accountant, receiver and liquidator. In 1988, Chin was involved in liquidating President Merlin Hotel, located along Kitchener Road, after rental arrears S$3 million was racked up by the hotel.

On 1 April 1992, Chin succeeded Keith Tay Ah Kee as managing partner of the Singapore branch of KPMG. In May 1993, Chin was appointed as treasurer of Nanyang Girls' High School.

On 1 April 1997, Chin was appointed to the board of the Urban Redevelopment Authority (URA). On 1 April 2001, Chin took over as chairman of URA, succeeding Khoo Cheng Lim.

In 2003, Chin was the first non-Indian to be appointed as a trustee to the Singapore Indian Development Association.

After 31 years at KPMG, Chin retired as managing partner at the end of September 2005.

=== Later career ===
On 1 January 2006, Chin was appointed as chairman of the Singapore Totalisator Board (Tote Board), replacing Yeo Ning Hong. On 31 March 2006, Chin stepped down as chairman of URA, and he was succeeded by Alan Chan.

On 1 January 2008, Chin succeeded Tang I-Fang as chairman of the Straits Trading Company, having been a board member since November 2005. On 2 January 2010, Chin was appointed by President S. R. Nathan to the Council of Presidential Advisers (CPA), replacing Cham Tao Soon. On 1 January 2012, Chin was succeeded by Moses Lee Kim Poo as chairman of the Tote Board.

In October 2013, a massive fire occurred at one of Singtel's major Internet exchanges at Bukit Panjang. Chin was appointed as the chairman of an independent committee of inquiry to look investigate the incident. The committee concluded that Singtel lacked proper fire safety practices.

In November 2013, Chin was appointed to chair a committee to expand MediShield, the nation's insurance scheme. Public discussions were held to invite citizens to share their concerns and suggestions. Eventually, the new revamped scheme, named MediShield Life, was unveiled in 2015.

In June 2014, Chin succeeded Ng Ser Miang as chairman of NTUC FairPrice. During his tenure, Chin announced schemes such as discounts for wholegrain rice to encourage consumers to explore healthier options.

On 1 October 2016, Chin took over James Koh Cher Siang as chairman of the Housing and Development Board (HDB). In 2020, after 10 years of service, Chin was replaced by Bahren Shaari as a member of CPA.

On 1 April 2023, Chin was succeeded by Benny Lim Siang Hoe as chairman of HDB.

== Personal life ==
Chin is married to Hooi Lai Ngarn, and he is a recreational golf player.

== Awards and decorations ==
- Distinguished Service Order, in 2023.
- Meritorious Service Medal, in 2017.
- Public Service Star, in 2011.
- Public Service Medal, in 2003.

== Legacy ==
- Bobby Chin and Lai Ngarn Bursary, a bursary in the National University of Singapore established in 2021, is named after him and his wife.
