= Moses Lee Kim Poo =

Former Singaporean civil servant

Moses Lee Kim Poo PJG PPA(E) PBS

Chairman of the Tote Board
- In office 1 January 2013 – 1 January 2021
- Preceded by: Bobby Chin
- Succeeded by: Mildred Tan

Chairman of the Sentosa Development Corporation
- In office 1 January 2013 – 31 March 2019
- Preceded by: Loo Choon Yong
- Succeeded by: Bob Tan Beng Hai

Chairman of the Central Provident Fund
- In office 1 January 2002 – 31 May 2005
- Preceded by: Koh Yong Guan
- Succeeded by: Koh Yong Guan

Personal details
- Born: 22 August 1951 (age 75) Colony of Singapore
- Children: 4
- Education: Harvard Business School (MPA); University of Singapore (BEng)

Chinese name
- Traditional Chinese: 李金富
- Simplified Chinese: 李金富
Transcriptions
Standard Mandarin
- Hanyu Pinyin: Lǐ Jīnfù
- IPA: [lì.tɕín.fû]

Moses Lee Kim Poo (Note: Chinese: see Chinese name and romanisations) PJG PPA(E) PBS (born 22 August 1951) is a former Singaporean engineer and President's Scholar, serving as permanent secretary for the Ministry of Labour (1994–1998), the Ministry of Community Development (1998–1999) and the Ministry of Health (1999–2005).

Lee served as a chairman of POSB Bank (1994–1998), Central Provident Fund (2002–2005), Sentosa Development Corporation (2013–2019), Tote Board (2013–2021) and GuocoLand (2013–2022). Lee also served as a director of M1 from 2015 to 2019.

== Early life and education ==
On 22 August 1951, Moses Lee Kim Poo was born in Singapore, and he was the fifth child. He had four brothers and five sisters, and they lived on a farmland located in Changi. Lee's father worked as a foreman for the transport division in the Royal Air Force, and his mother was a homemaker.

Lee received his early education at Telok Paku Primary School, and later St. Stephen's School. Upon completing his Primary School Leaving Examination, Lee enrolled in St. Patrick's School, and obtained a Higher School Certificate. After graduation, Lee applied to Malaysia–Singapore Airlines as a cadet pilot, but he was unsuccessful.

In 1970, Lee was chosen by the Public Service Commission as one of eight President's Scholars. (Note: Namely, Lee Hsien Loong, Chin Foong Tow, Hsieh Tsun Yan, Goh Chin Ee, Lee Cheok Yew, Low Siok Ching, and Dennis Yong.) In line with the Government's aim of training more engineers, Lee enrolled in the University of Singapore. However, due to an overwhelming intake, Lee had to spend most of his time at the Prince Edward campus, instead of the main Bukit Timah campus. As such, lessons and practicals were conducted using facilities at the adjacent Singapore Polytechnic campus. In 1974, Lee graduated with first class honours, and obtained a Bachelor of Engineering in mechanical and production engineering.

In 1982, Lee graduated from Harvard Business School with a Master of Public Administration.

== Career ==
Although trained as an engineer, Lee was posted to the administrative service in 1974, serving in the development division of the Ministry of Finance (MOF). His first task was to write a paper about industrial land use. Two years later, Lee was transferred to the Ministry of National Development. As the government was phasing out pig farms on mainland, Lee was tasked to study the feasibility of shifting the pig farms to Pulau Ubin. However, he concluded that there would be a logistical constraint of bringing supplies to and from the island, and the idea was not feasible. Thereafter, under the chairmanship of Cheng Tong Fatt, Lee was part of a committee to transform Singapore into a "garden city", serving as its secretary.

After graduating from Harvard in 1982, Lee was posted to the Ministry of Environment. During this period, Lee was involved in writing progress reports and papers about the clean up of the Singapore River and the Kallang Basin to the Cabinet. Three years later, in 1986, he was transferred to the Ministry of Education, serving as director of personnel and planning matters. Lee oversaw the deployment of principals and senior management across schools.

In 1987, Lee was appointed as principal private secretary to Prime Minister Lee Kuan Yew. Lee accompanied PM Lee on all overseas trips, and assisted with drafting speeches and presentations. In 1991, he was seconded to the Singapore Broadcasting Corporation as its general manager, replacing Wong-Lee Siok Tin. In 1994, Lee was appointed as permanent secretary for the Ministry of Labour and chairman of POSB Bank.

In December 1997, Lee succeeded Er Kwong Wah as permanent secretary for the Ministry of Community Development. On 1 June 1999, Lee took over Koh Yong Guan as permanent secretary for the Ministry of Health.

=== Later years ===
In 2005, Lee stepped down as permanent secretary, and he was appointed as commissioner of the Inland Revenue Authority of Singapore. He held the role until his retirement on 1 November 2012, relinquishing the position to Tan Kim Siew.

On 1 January 2013, Lee became chairman of the Sentosa Development Corporation and Tote Board, succeeding Loo Choon Yong and Bobby Chin respectively. On 1 November 2013, Lee was also appointed chairman of GuocoLand.

== Personal life ==
Lee is a Catholic.

While studying at Harvard, Lee and his wife had their first child. His wife is two years younger and works as a lawyer. In total, they have four children.

== Awards and decorations ==
- Meritorious Service Medal, in 2023.
- Long Service Medal, in 1999.
- Public Administration Medal (Gold), in 1996.
