= European Union Centers of Excellence in the United States =

Promotion of the study of the European Union

European Union Centers of Excellence logo

The European Union Centers of Excellence in the United States is a network of eight university programs dedicated to the promotion of the study of the European Union as well as the strengthening of ties between the people of the EU and the United States. The centres operate through teaching programs, as well as academic research and community outreach. Their development has allowed for the growth and improvement of EU studies in US higher education and made them a source of information for a far-reaching US audience.

The centres receive funding from the Delegation of the European Union to the United States and the "Centers of Excellence" title is awarded to those with the highest quality, variety and depth of their programming.

== History ==
The European Union was created in 1948, post World War II to unite European communities. Some of the institutions that make up the European Union are the European Parliament, European Commission, and the European Council. While the United States is not a part of the European Union, the two work together and collaborate in various global issues and trade relations.

EU Centres of Excellence were established in the US and Canada in 1998, based in American universities that best promote the creation and strengthening of people-to-people ties across the Atlantic. There are now 37 Centres located in Australia, Canada, Hong Kong, Japan, Macao, New Zealand, Russia, South Korea, Taiwan and the United States. The grant program in the United States is managed by the Delegation of the European Union to the United States, the representative body of the EU in the dealings with the US government.

The fifth cycle of the grant competition of the EU Centers program took place in 2014, with the following eight centres chosen as the winners:

American Consortium on EU Studies:

- University of Colorado Boulder
- Florida International University and University of Miami
- University of Illinois Urbana-Champaign
- University of North Carolina at Chapel Hill
- University of Pittsburgh
- University of Texas at Austin
- University of Washington

In his speech announcing the winners of the 2011 competition, Ambassador João Vale de Almeida, head of the EU Delegation to the United States, said: "The EU Centers of Excellence play a vital role in highlighting the importance of the transatlantic relationship and help inform students and the public at large about the European Union. Since it was launched in 1998, the EU Centers of Excellence program has helped EU studies in US higher education, served as an information resource for a broad audience, and facilitated an informed debate about EU-US relations."

In 2020, the American University's School of International Service launched the Transatlantic Policy Center as an EU Jean Monnet Center of Excellence. Since 1990, North American researchers and institutions have hosted 63 Jean Monnet Chairs and 40 Jean Monnet Centers of Excellence.

== Individual centers ==
The American Consortium on EU Studies (ACES) is a partnership among American University, George Mason University, George Washington University, Georgetown University and Johns Hopkins University. The centre was established in 2001 to advance academic and public understanding of the European Union as well as the relationship between the United States and the EU. Its goals are to create new interactions between various political and academic sectors and to improve academic and research opportunities. Education, research, policy outreach, media and publications are the centre's main themes.

The Colorado European Union Center of Excellence (CEUCE) at the University of Colorado at Boulder, founded in 2008, advances the relationship of people between the American Mountain States region and the European Union. The centre focuses on teaching, research, and outreach. It promotes academic advancement through research, the development of new undergraduate and graduate courses, and hosting various speakers. It also takes part in widespread community outreach and promotes the enhancement of new relationships between public, private, and academic sectors.

The Miami-Florida European Union Center of Excellence (MEUCE) was founded in 2001 and involves Florida International University and the University of Miami. The centre works to create new courses on the EU, provides graduate students and faculty financial support on EU-related research topics, and participates in other academic and outreach activities to accomplish its mission. Some of these activities include sponsoring EU lectures and holding workshops and conferences.

The European Union Center at the University of Illinois at Urbana–Champaign is one of the ten original centres in the US. It was created in 1998 with help from the European Commission and was designated as a Title VI National Resource Center by the US Department of Education in 2003. The centre offers a Master of Arts in European Union Studies (MAEUS) program, a Graduate Minor in EU studies offered to Masters and PhD students from other disciplines, undergraduate concentrations, as well as a diversity of EU-related course offerings taught across the university's curriculum.

The University of North Carolina at Chapel Hill European Union Center of Excellence is the network coordinator for the ten EU Centers of Excellence. The centre aims to improve the understanding of the social, political, and economic events shaping contemporary Europe by encouraging graduate and faculty research through funding and offering various academic programs on both the undergraduate and graduate level. The academic programs offered include an undergraduate major in Contemporary European Studies; a graduate certificate program, Teaching Languages Across the Curriculum, as well as two graduate concentrations within the Political Science program: Transatlantic Studies, run in partnership with five European universities, and European Governance, run in partnership with the Vrije Universiteit (Free University – Amsterdam), and Sciences Po – Paris. The main themes of the program are transatlantic relations, European integration, and European and comparative social policy.

The University of Pittsburgh European Union Center of Excellence is a part of the University Center for International Studies, distinguished by the Council on Learning as one of the excellent international studies programs in the US. Since its establishment in 1998, the centre continues to encourage the study of the EU through teaching programs, academic research, and community outreach activities. The main concentrations of the centre are EU relations with countries around the world, as well as its post-enlargement transformation. The Center serves as the hub for EU-related activities taking place in the tri-state region of Pennsylvania, West Virginia, and Ohio. Pittsburgh's University Library System also contains the entire EU depository collection, the most extensive collection of public European Community/EU documents and publications in North America.

The European Union Center of Excellence at the University of Texas at Austin was founded in 2012 and it aims to incite discussion on the common challenges facing the EU and the US. The main theme of the centre is Trans-National policy Challenges, with three distinct sub-themes further explored over the three-year grant period: Post-Recession Policy Challenges in year one, Geopolitics as Trans-National Policy Challenge in year two, and Law and Media in year three. The EUCE at UT-Austin offers students an undergraduate degree and a doctoral portfolio program in European Studies. It is also in the process of developing an M.A. program in European Studies.

The EU Center of Excellence of Seattle is one of the ten original EU centres. Housed at the University of Washington, the centre is a resource for the Pacific Northwest communities. The centre supports a broad range of teaching, research, and outreach, with a particular focus on trans-Atlantic relations and EU law and institutions. An undergraduate major and minor in European Studies is offered by the university, and an EU track is organised by the centre to accompany the major .

The EU Centre in Singapore is the first Centre in Southeast Asia which opened in June 2008. It is a partnership between the European Commission, National University of Singapore, Nanyang Technological University and the thinktank, Singapore Institute of International Affairs. Its aim is to promote knowledge of the European Union and its policies. It organises speaker events, discussions and exhibitions; publishes books, papers and teaching materials; and sends staff to visit schools and colleges in Singapore.
