= EU Centre in Singapore =

The European Union (EU) Centre in Singapore is part of a global network of European Union Centres of Excellence. Following the launch of EU Centres of Excellence in the US and Canada in 1998, there are now 37 Centres located in Australia, Canada, Hong Kong, Japan, Macao, New Zealand, Russia, South Korea, Taiwan and the United States.

The Singapore Centre, the first in Southeast Asia, opened in June 2008. It is a partnership between the European Commission, the National University of Singapore, Nanyang Technological University and the thinktank, Singapore Institute of International Affairs. Its aim is to promote knowledge of the European Union and its policies. It organises speaker events, discussions and exhibitions; publishes books, papers and teaching materials; and sends staff to visit schools and colleges in Singapore.

== History ==
The Memorandum of Understanding (MOU) establishing the Centre was signed by the then EU Commissioner for Information Society and Media, Viviane Reding, with two local partners, National University of Singapore (NUS) and Nanyang Technological University on 20 June 2008. The Centre in Singapore is the first located in Southeast Asia. According to a joint press release by the Delegation of the European Union to Singapore, that is the EU's diplomatic representation in Singapore, and the Centre's other stakeholders, the three way partnership is between the European Commission, and "two leading universities, both in the region and the world, with extensive networks both across Europe and throughout Asia".

The EU Centre has received another 3-year grant (2013–2015) to continue its mission to promote knowledge of the EU and its policies and raise the visibility of the EU in Singapore. A new partner, the Singapore Institute of International Affairs (SIIA), the oldest think tank in Singapore, is now part of the consortium. The Director of the Centre is Dr Yeo Lay Hwee, who also teaches as an adjunct lecturer of politics and European studies at the NUS and the Singapore Management University.

== Aims ==
The EU Centre has been cited by Finnlink magazine as a Centre intended to “raise awareness of the longstanding partnership between the EU and Singapore, and the EU and ASEAN, and promote knowledge and visibility of the EU in Singapore through different outreach activities, education, research and publications… the Centre’s objective is to raise awareness of the EU to a local and regional audience, foster a finer understanding of the EU and its member states, and analyze EU policies and their positions on global issues”.

== Activities since 2008 ==
The EU Centre's activities revolve around outreach, education and research. The Centre, like other centres and institutes co-funded by the EU, organises lectures, workshops and seminars year round. The events have attracted speakers who are senior policy decision makers, such as Klaus Regling, former Director General of Ecofin and now the Managing Director of the European Stability Mechanism (ESM), who spoke on "The Euro After 10 Years" in a distinguished lecture co-hosted by the Lee Kuan Yew School of Public Policy and European Chamber of Commerce. The Centre held an academic conference on 6‐8 Dec 2009 Networked versus Institutional Regionalism", where Professor Tommy Koh delivered the keynote speech.Its outreach event mass, the "Green Innovations Symposium" was featured in media. Its "Corporate Social Responsibility Business Schools Debate" drew a 700 strong audience and was moderated by Ms Claire Chiang, Chairperson of Banyan Tree Global Foundation, the CSR arm of Banyan Tree Holdings. The EU Centre regularly partners research institutions and think tanks such as Asia-Europe Foundation to host events such as a public talk by Alain Ruche, Deputy Head of Unit, External Relations Directorate-General, European Commission. and collaborates with others in research, such as in "The EU through the Eyes of Asia" project of the National Centre for Research on Europe (NCRE), University of Canterbury.

During its first grant period from 2008 - 2012, the Centre organised more than 100 public events ranging from lectures, talks, seminars and panel discussions. It also organised several competitions to reach out to younger Singaporeans and Southeast Asians.

In support of the official Asia-Europe Meeting (ASEM) process and the 9th ASEM Summit to be held in Vientiane, the EU Centre teamed up with the Asia-Europe Foundation (ASEF) and National Library Board (NLB) to put together an Exhibition entitled "Connected Histories, Shared Future" showcasing the work done by ASEF and EU Centre to bring about greater connections and exchanges between Asia and Europe.

The Exhibition was inaugurated at the National Library Building in Singapore by Emeritus Senior Minister Goh Chok Tong (Prime Minister of Singapore from 1991 – 2004) on 17 May 2012. The Exhibition was on displayed for a month at the Main Central Library of the NLB before travelling to four other locations in Singapore – to the Jurong Regional Library, Woodlands Regional Library, NTU Lee Wee Nam Library and NUS Central Library each for 3–4 weeks. As the centrepiece and final destination for 2012, the Exhibition was brought to Vientiane, Laos in November 2012 and set up at the National Convention Centre, where 51 leaders from Asia and Europe were convening for the 9th ASEM Summit. The Exhibition was also viewed by the ASEM senior officials prior to the Leaders meeting.

== Publications ==
The EU Centre sees publications as an important avenue not only to share research findings, build up knowledge on the EU and generate further discussions and debates on issues, but also as an important outreach tool. The EU Centre publishes working papers targeted at the academic community to encourage exploration and discussion of various subjects pertinent to the EU and Southeast Asia, and also a series of background and policy briefs aimed at the policy makers and the broader public to explain the background to some of the EU’s policies, and to discuss their relevance for Singapore or the region. Our latest publication is a book containing a collection of essays by European and Asian scholars, policy makers, journalists and young researchers entitled "Changing Tides and Changing Ties - Anchoring Asia-Europe Relations in Challenging Times".

== Outreach to schools and junior colleges ==
Staff and Associates of the EU Centre visited some 30 pre-university institutions, mostly Junior College and Integrated Programme schools, to bring the European Union and its global relevance to the students, as well as raise the level of interest in European Studies.

The Centre also published three Resource packages for teachers to explain the role of the EU in global trade, its role in conflict management and also to explain monetary integration and the crisis in the Eurozone.
