= SIIA =

SIIA may refer to:

- Singapore Institute of International Affairs, a Singaporean research institute and think tank
- Software and Information Industry Association, an American trade association dedicated to the entertainment, consumer and business software industries
