= AMRO (disambiguation) =

AMRO may refer to:

- AMRO, for ASEAN+3 Macroeconomic and Research Office, a linked multilateral surveillance body
- AMRO Bank (contraction of AMsterdamsche & ROtterdamsche Bank), a former Dutch bank
- ABN AMRO, a Dutch bank formed by 1991 merger of AMRO Bank with Algemene Bank Nederland
- Amroha railway station, Uttar Pradesh, India (by Indian Railways station code)
- The Pan American Health Organization, as AMericas Regional Office (abbreviated as AMRO) of the World Health Organization
