= Moses Lee =

Moses Lee may refer to:

- Moses Lindley Lee (1805–1876), US Representative from New York
- Moses Lee Kim Poo (born 1951), former Singaporean civil servant
