= Benny Lim =

Singaporean civil servant

Benny Lim DUBC PJG PPA(E) PPA(P)

Chairman of the Housing and Development Board
- Incumbent
- Assumed office 1 April 2023
- Preceded by: Bobby Chin

Chairman of the National Parks Board
- In office 1 August 2018 – 30 September 2023
- Preceded by: Christina Ong
- Succeeded by: Loh Khum Yean

Director of the Internal Security Department
- In office 1 April 1997 – 2004
- Preceded by: Chiang Chie Foo
- Succeeded by: Pang Kin Keong

Personal details
- Born: Benny Lim Siang Hoe; March 1957 (age 69) Terengganu, Malaya
- Education: London School of Economics and Political Science (MSc); National University of Singapore (BA)

Chinese name
- Traditional Chinese: 林雙河
- Simplified Chinese: 林双河
Transcriptions
Standard Mandarin
- Hanyu Pinyin: Lín Shuānghé
- IPA: [lǐn.ʂuáŋ.xɤ̌]

Benny Lim Siang Hoe (Note: Chinese: see Chinese name and romanisation) DUBC PJG PPA(E) PPA(P) (born March 1957) is a Singaporean civil servant and the incumbent chairman of the Housing and Development Board.

From 1997 to 2004, Lim was director of the Internal Security Department. Lim was permanent secretary of the Ministry of Home Affairs (2005–2011), Prime Minister's Office (2011–2016), Ministry of National Development (2011–2016) and National Security Coordination Secretariat (2011–2016). Lim also served as a director of SBS Transit from 2018 to 2021, and chairman of Temasek Foundation from 2020 to 2024.

== Early life and education ==
In March 1957, Benny Lim Siang Hoe was born in Terengganu, Malaya, and was the second son in his family. In 1959, Lim and his family moved to Singapore as his father, Henry Lim, was offered a job at Malayan Bitumen Products, located in Bukit Timah, His mother worked briefly as a nurse before becoming a homemaker after Lim was born. Lim and his family lived in Katong.

Lim received his early education at Siglap Primary School, and later moved on to Raffles Institution (RI). An active sports player, Lim represented RI at judo, discus and shot put competitions. A head prefect of RI, he obtained a Singapore-Cambridge GCE Ordinary Level in 1973 and a Singapore-Cambridge GCE Advanced Level in 1975.

In 1981, under a police scholarship awarded by the Public Service Commission, Lim graduated from the National University of Singapore and obtained a Bachelor of Arts with honours in english literature. Lim proceeded to pursue graduate studies at the London School of Economics and Political Science. He graduated in 1990 with a Master of Science with distinction in political sociology.

== Career ==
In 1975, Lim began his career as a police constable in the Singapore Police Force (SPF), inspired by his mother who was also a volunteer social worker.

On 1 October 1984, Lim was one of four officers from the Internal Security Department (ISD) to be promoted to deputy superintendent. He was later promoted to senior assistant commissioner of SPF and deputy director of ISD.

On 1 April 1997, Lim succeeded Chiang Chie Foo as director of ISD. On 1 January 2004, Lim assumed the portfolio of second permanent secretary for the Ministry of Home Affairs (MHA), and promoted to permanent secretary a year later. In May 2005, Lim signed a memorandum of understanding with Riaz Mohammad Khan to increase collaboration between Pakistan and Singapore and combat terrorism.

On 1 September 2011, while concurrently permanent secretary for MHA, Lim succeeded Chiang as permanent secretary for the Prime Minister's Office. Two months later, Lim swapped portfolios with Tan Tee How, assuming the position of permanent secretary of the Ministry of National Development, while Tan assumed his position at MHA. Lim was also appointed as permanent secretary for the National Security Coordination Secretariat.

On 30 April 2016, after 37 years in the public service, Lim retired. The next day, Lim was appointed as co-managing director of Infocomm Development Authority, to prepare for the merger with the Media Development Authority. In a tribute to Lim, Prime Minister Lee Hsien Loong said Lim was “respected and loved as a leader” and added that "the ministers, in particular, will miss his political acumen, strong heart and clear mind".

On 1 August 2018, Lim was appointed as chairman of the National Parks Board (NParks), succeeding Christina Ong. On 1 April 2023, Lim succeeded Bobby Chin as chairman of the Housing and Development Board. On 30 September 2023, Lim stepped down as chairman of NParks, and he was succeeded by Loh Khum Yean.

== Personal life ==
Lim has two beagles. His younger brother, Raymond Lim, is a former Singaporean politician.

== Awards and decorations ==
- Public Administration Medal (Silver), in 1987.
- Public Administration Medal (Gold), in 2002.
- Meritorious Service Medal, in 2010.
- Distinguished Service Order, in 2021.
