= Yeo Kiat Seng =

Singaporean academic

Yeo Kiat Seng (Chinese: 杨杰圣; pinyin: Yáng Jiéshèng) is a Singaporean academic and IEEE Fellow known for his contributions to low-power Integrated Circuit (IC) design.

== Education ==
Yeo attended Nanyang Technological University (NTU), Singapore and obtained a 2.1 Honours for his Bachelor of Engineering (Electrical Engineering) (1993) and Doctor of Philosophy (Electrical Engineering) (1996).

== Career ==
After working in the electronics industry for 4 years, Yeo embarked on his academic career in 1993. In 1996, he became a faculty member in Nanyang Technological University (NTU), Singapore and lectured on integrated circuit design. Yeo was a Full Professor at NTU with 13 years in management positions as Sub-Dean (Student Affairs) (1 January 2001 - 30 June 2005) and Head of Circuits and Systems (1 July 2005 - 30 June 2011) in the School of Electrical and Electronic Engineering (EEE). He was the Founding Director of VIRTUS, IC Design Centre of Excellence (1 January 2009 - 30 September 2010) and was elected as NTU’s Senator (23 September 2009 - 31 August 2014).

In July 2014, Yeo served as the Associate Provost (Graduate Studies and International Relations), Singapore University of Technology and Design (SUTD) before assuming the appointment of Associate Provost (Research and International Relations) and Chairman of University Research Board in January 2018.

== Academic work ==
Yeo is the first SUTD faculty to be conferred IEEE Fellowship with effect from 1 January 2016 for his contributions to low-power integrated circuit design. For his academic work in modeling and employing parasitic BJTs (hybrid-mode devices) in deep-sub-micrometer CMOS process, Yeo has invented, characterized, modeled and fabricated several RF inductors, transformers, varactors and filters. For example, the transformers have been used to design a wide frequency-tuning-range CMOS 60-GHz VCO. Yeo fabricated the world’s smallest on-chip low-pass filter with the broadest stop-band up to 52 times the cut-off frequency, i.e., 110-GHz had been attained. The size of the filter is only 350 μm by 280 μm and its measured pass-band insertion loss is less than 2.2 dB.

He has translated his research in low-power RF/mm-wave IC technology into solutions and commercial products. He is the principal inventor of the Virtus (chipset) which functions in the unlicensed 57 to 66-GHz band with time division duplexing. Fully compliant with IEEE 802.11ad standard, it is minimally 1,000 times faster than Bluetooth 2.0 with power consumption of less than 300 mW. Supporting 2.5 Gbit/s video streaming at a distance of 10 m, this chipset features 36G/24G front-end transceiver architecture with carrier suppression and ultra-low unwanted emissions (US Patent 9083437) and power amplifier and linearization techniques using active and passive devices (US Patent 9130511). Yeo’s publications hold several low-power RF integrated circuits and systems. His works in RF/mm-wave are shown in his four books.

== Research work ==
He established a R&D facility on RF/mm-wave research in Asia in 1997. Besides, Yeo set up the S$52m IC Design Centre of Excellence, VIRTUS in 2009 and became its Founding Director. VIRTUS focuses on IC design research and education for applications in automation, healthcare, Internet of Things (IoT), mobile communication and smart home. Yeo has also supported in the economic development of Singapore’s IC design and NTU’s ranking of 16th in the world and among the top 3 in Asia in 2008 IC Design Research Ranking for Worldwide Universities.

Yeo’s research in IC design has practical impacts for the electronics/semiconductor industry and academia. Since 2000, various funding agencies and the industry have awarded Yeo with research funding of more than S$70m as Principal Investigator. More than 100 research fellows, postdocs, PhD and Master’s students have Yeo as their supervisor.

Alongside the authorship of 10 books, 7 book chapters and over 600 refereed journal and conference papers. In 2020, Yeo proposed a new university ranking index based on a methodology designed to evaluate research multi-disciplinary. It is complemented by indicators to gauge research impact and research collaborative-ness. Together, these 3 key aspects make up the composite index for the World University Research Rankings (WURR) 2020.

== Awards and honours ==
- Pingat Pentadbiran Awam (Gangsa), Public Administration Medal (Bronze), by the President, Singapore for his outstanding efficiency, competence and industry (2009)
- Nanyang Alumni Achievement Award by NTU for his exemplary achievements in research (2009)
- Singapore Infocomm Technology Federation (SiTF) 'Special Mention' Award under Emerging Technologies Category Awards for Singapore’s Next Generation WiFi Chipset (2012)
- IEEE Fellow for his contributions to low-power integrated circuit design (2016)
- Pingat Bakti Setia (Long Service Award) by the President of Singapore (2020)
- Fellow of the Asia-Pacific Artificial Intelligence Association (AAIA) (2021)
