= Lam Yi Young =

Singaporean business executive and former civil servant

Lam Yi Young PPA(P) PBS
- 蓝一洋
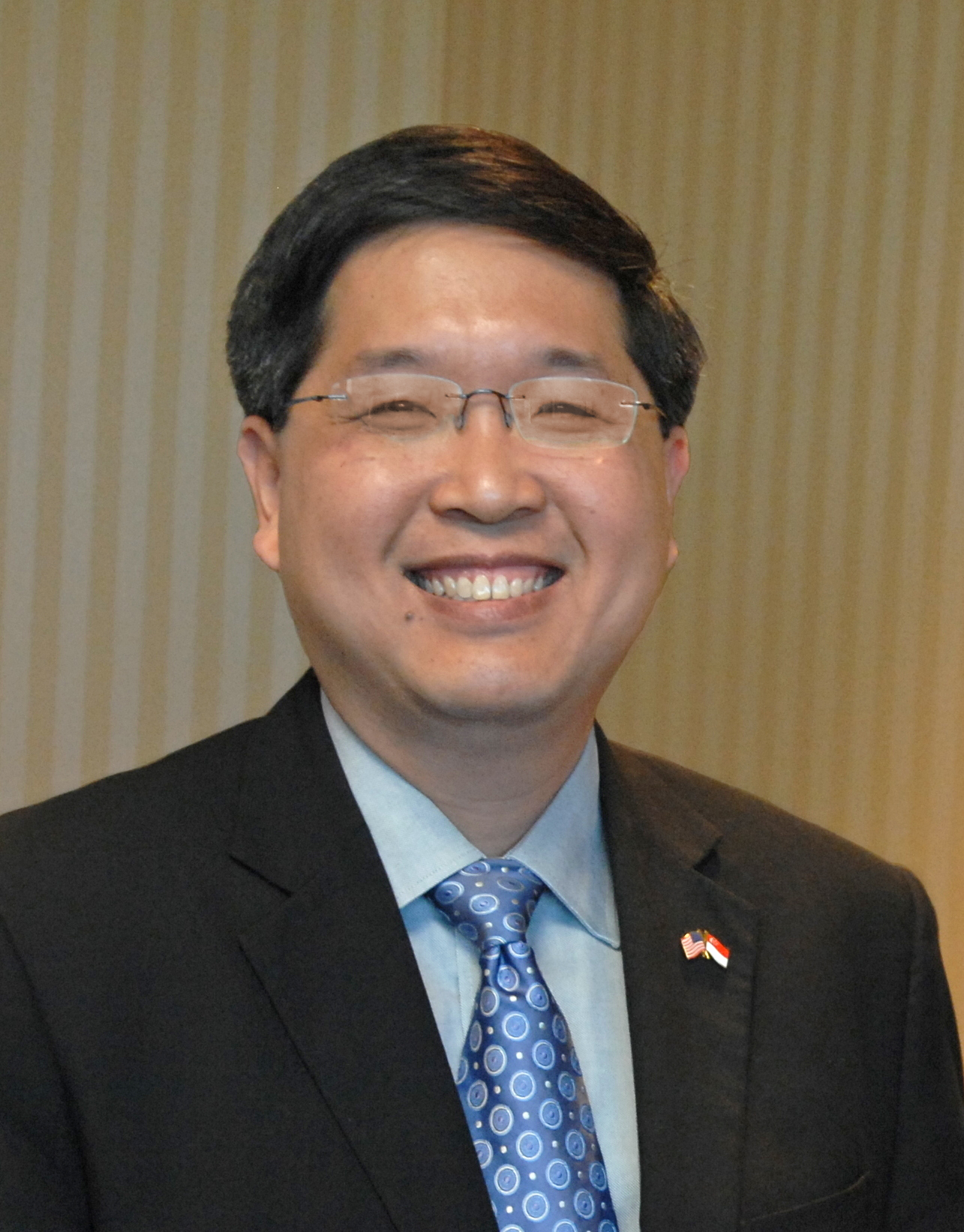
- Lam Yi Young in Washington, D.C. in May 2011

Chief Executive Officer, SBF
- Incumbent
- Assumed office 1 January 2021
- Preceded by: Ho Meng Kit

Personal details
- Born: 1972 (age 53–54)
- Education: Victoria Junior College
- Alma mater: University of Cambridge (BA, MA); John F. Kennedy School of Government (MPA)
- Board member of: Global Compact Network Singapore; Accounting and Corporate Regulatory Authority
- Honours: Pingat Pentadbiran Awam (Perak) (2015); Pingat Bakti Setia (2019)

Lam Yi Young PPA(P) PBS (Chinese: 蓝一洋; pinyin: Lán Yī Yáng; born 1972) is the former Chief Executive Officer of the Singapore Business Federation (SBF) and former Senior Civil Servant. He is also the former Chief Executive of the Maritime and Port Authority of Singapore (MPA).

== Education ==
Lam studied at Victoria Junior College as part of the cohort of 1989.

He then studied at the University of Cambridge from 1991 to 1994 and graduated with a degree in engineering

Lam later studied at the John F. Kennedy School of Government at Harvard University from 2004–2005 and graduated with a Master of Public Administration.

== Career ==
=== Civil Service ===
Lam spent 24 years in the Singapore Civil Service from 1996–2020 in positions in the Ministry of Defence, the Ministry of Finance, the Ministry of Education (MOE), the MPA and the Ministry of Trade and Industry (MTI). This included 11 years in Senior Public Sector Leadership positions from 2009–2020, including as Chief Executive of the MPA, Deputy Secretary (Policy) in the MOE, as well as Deputy Secretary (Future Economy) and later Deputy Secretary (Industry) in the MTI.

==== MPA ====
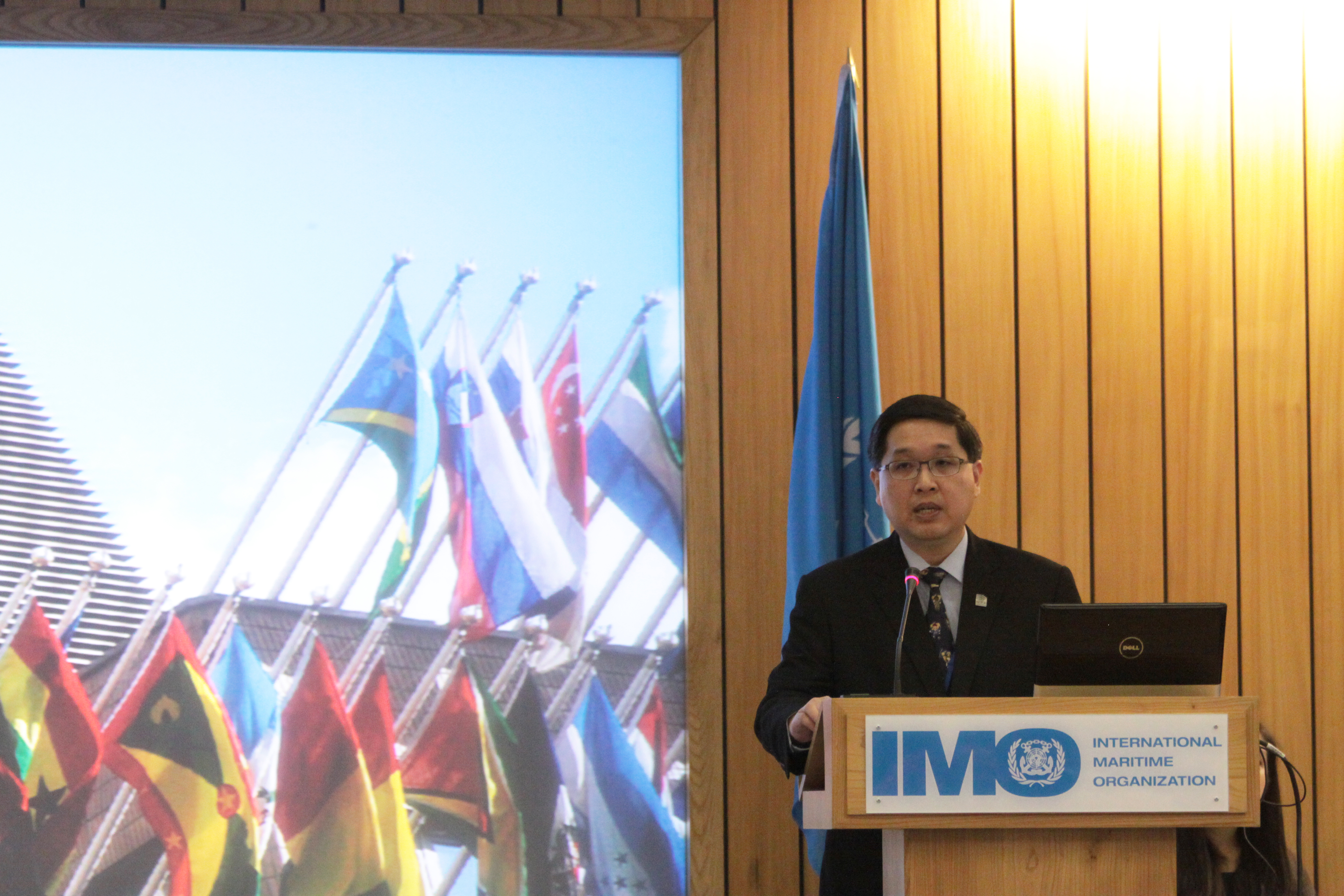
Lam speaks at the World Maritime Day Symposium on 26 September 2013.

Lam was Chief Executive of the Maritime and Port Authority of Singapore from May 2009–December 2013.

During his tenure at MPA, Lam was involved in the commissioning of the new Port Operations Control Centre (POCC) at Changi Naval Base and the decommissioning of the POCC at Tanjong Pagar Complex. Lam was also involved in the formation of various maritime initiatives related to education and decreasing environmental impacts of shipping, including witnessing signings of the Singapore Maritime Green Pledge which was first launched in 2011. He was involved in the formation of the Singapore Maritime Institute and the opening of the Singapore Maritime Gallery in 2012. He also signed Memorandums of Understanding to launch and support various educational and research and development programmes in the fields of maritime and clean energy.

Lam held his keynote address Towards a Sustainable Maritime Singapore at the World Maritime Day Symposium in 2013 on Singapore's approach to, experience with, and commitment to, sustainable maritime development.

=== SBF ===
On 1 January 2021, Lam succeeded Ho Meng Kit to become the CEO of SBF. He previously was the deputy CEO after joining SBF in July 2020.

=== Other ===
Lam is the vice-president of the Global Compact Network Singapore and a board member of the Accounting and Corporate Regulatory Authority.

== Honours ==
- Singapore:
  - Pingat Pentadbiran Awam (Perak) - PPA(P) (Public Administration Medal (Silver)) (2015)
  - Pingat Bakti Setia - PBS (Long Service Medal) (2019)
