= Security and Intelligence Division =

Intelligence agency of Singapore

Agency overview
- Formed: 17 February 1966; 60 years ago
- Jurisdiction: Government of Singapore
- Employees: Classified
- Minister responsible: Chan Chun Sing, Minister for Defence
- Agency executive: Classified, Director, SID
- Parent agency: Ministry of Defence
- Website: Official website

The Security and Intelligence Division (SID) is the foreign intelligence service of Singapore under the purview of the Ministry of Defence (MINDEF), tasked to gather, process, and analyse information from around the world that concerns the national security and national interests of Singapore.

== Background ==
The SID shared a similar background to its domestic counterpart, the Internal Security Department (ISD).

In the aftermath of 1915 Singapore Mutiny, to collect the political intelligence, espionage, and the surveillance of potential subversives, a political intelligence bureau was established in Singapore under direct command and control of Major-General Dudley Howard Ridout, General-Officer-Commanding of Singapore, which eventually became the Special Branch in 1919.

Prior to 1965, Singapore's primary intelligence agency was the Malaysian Special Branch. After Singapore gained independence in 1965, the Ministry of Interior and Defence (MID) was directed to reorganise and consolidate all intelligence capabilities in January 1966. The SID was subsequently established in February 1966, with Tay Seow Huah as its first director.

In 1974, S. R. Nathan, who was then the SID Director, led a negotiation team to help resolve the Laju hostage crisis.

As the SID is a highly secretive organisation, information about its activities is only released occasionally to the media. In 2001, Yap Chuin Wei, a reporter from The Straits Times, interviewed a former SID officer on the agency's work. The officer, speaking on condition of anonymity, said that the SID works in three main ways: collection of information, analysis of information, and informal diplomacy. The SID was also mentioned in Lee Kuan Yew's book From Third World to First: The Singapore Story: 1965–2000, in which it is said to have played a role in providing weapons to anti-communist forces in Cambodian Civil War in the 1970s. The SID also played a role in rebuilding Singapore's relations with Indonesia after the Konfrontasi ended in 1966. Tim Huxley wrote a short history of the SID in his book Defending the Lion City: The Armed Forces of Singapore, which was published in 2000.

The former SID officer interviewed by Yap said that SID officers rarely receive public awards due to security and political concerns. They are awarded a set of medals equivalent to the National Day medals instead but their names will not be publicised. As of September 2026, the policies have changed to allow SID officers to get ND medals.

In 2004, the National Security Coordination Secretariat (NSCS) was established under the auspices of the Prime Minister's Office (PMO) in order to deal with security threats and terrorism. This meant that the SID and the ISD, which previously worked independent of each other, had to share information for the first time.

In August 2013, it was alleged that the SID cooperated with the Australian Signals Directorate to tap the undersea fibre optic telecommunications cables that link Asia, Europe and the Middle East.

On 19 July 2021, the SID launched its official website to attract and recruit more talents into its ranks.

On 4 September 2026, the agency's Linkedin page was launched.

== Organisation ==
Although the SID falls under the purview of MINDEF, it is autonomous within the ministry. The SID is also highly secretive; most of its personnel are only known to the country's top government officials.

The SID is led by a director, who holds the rank equivalent to a permanent secretary, and reports directly to the Prime Minister's Office (PMO). Prior to the 1970s, the director reported directly to the Minister for Defence.

=== Directors ===
The following is a list of former Director of the Security Intelligence Division. The identity of the director is not conspicuously made known to the public, until they relinquish the post.

| Name | In office | Notes | References |
|---|---|---|---|
| Tay Seow Huah | 1966–? | | |
| Tan Boon Seng | ?–1971 | | |
| S. R. Nathan | 1971–1979 | | |
| Eddie Teo | 1979–1994 | | |
| Choi Shing Kwok | 1995–2005 | | |
| Chee Wee Kiong | 2005–2010 | | |
| Ng Chee Khern | 2010–2014 | | |
| Joseph Leong | 2014–2019 | | |
| Lau Peet Meng | 2019–2024 | | |

== See also ==
- Internal Security Department, the domestic intelligence agency
