= Outram Secondary School =

Coordinates: 1.3977502°N 103.8912304°E

Location
- 48 Anchorvale Crescent, Singapore 549936

Information
- Type: Public; Government
- Motto: Labor Omnia Vincit (Labour Conquers All); A Hallmark of Distinction
- Established: 26 February 1906; 120 years ago
- School code: 3215
- Principal: Keith Tan
- Enrolment: 800
- Colour: Red Yellow Blue
- Yearbook: Outram Annual
- Website: http://www.outramsec.moe.edu.sg

Outram Secondary School is a co-educational government secondary school in Singapore. Founded in 1906 as Outram Road School, and later Outram School, it is one of the oldest schools in Singapore. It is also the only government school in Singapore to have a swimming pool.

The school also enrols deaf students who do not need to use sign language to communicate.

== History ==
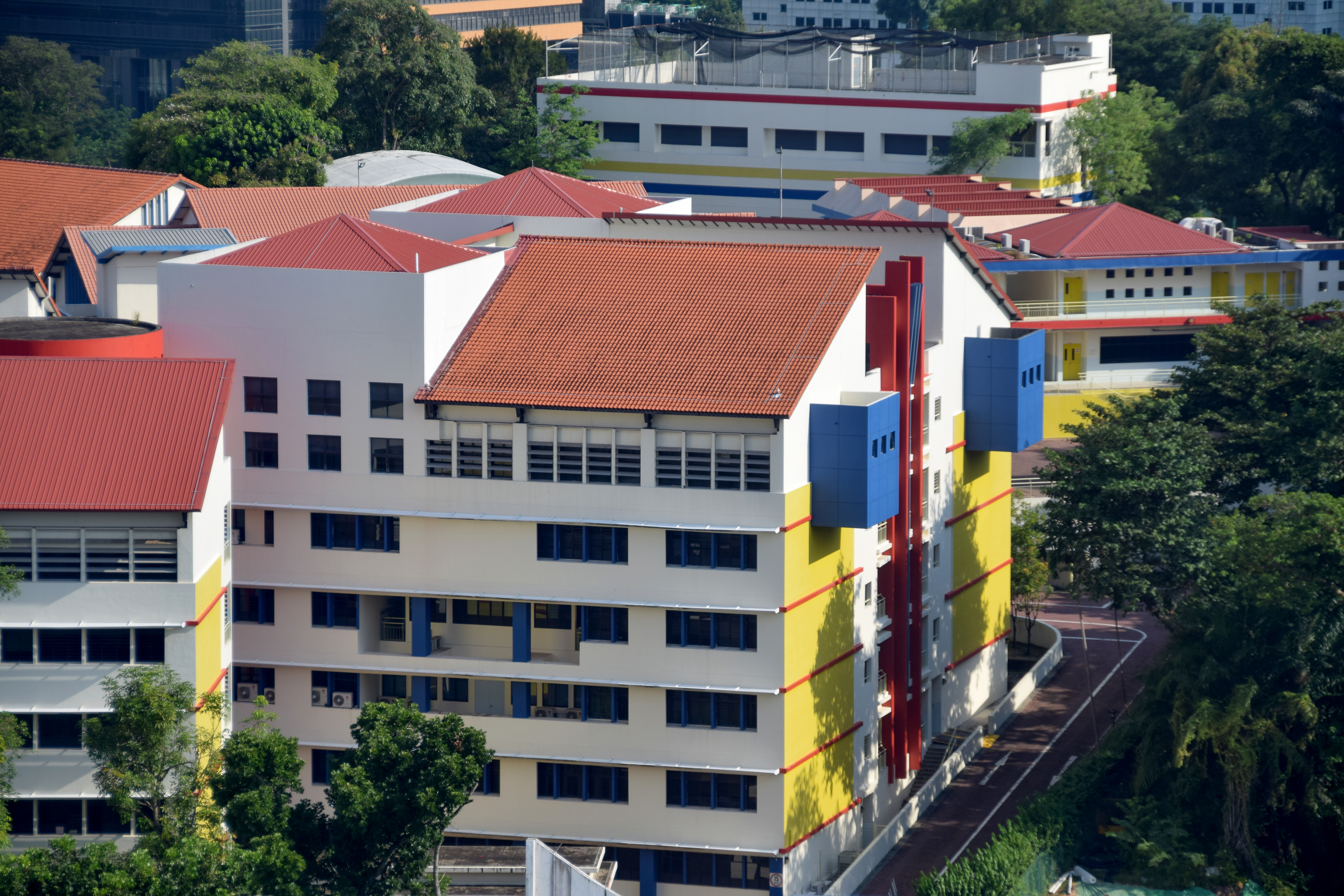
Outram secondary school facilities

Before 1874, in response to the need to provide opportunities for learning English through the medium of the mother tongue of the various races, two schools were built in Singapore, one at Cross Street and other at Kampong Glam. As the numbers in the school at Cross Street grew, a new school, Outram Road School, was built at Outram Road, opened by the Governor of the Straits Settlements, Sir John Anderson, on 26 February 1906. By gazette notification in 1939, the word "Road" was deleted and the school was known as Outram School.

Outram School functioned as a Primary School. Acting as a feeder school, Pearl's Hill Standard One proceeded to Standard Two at Outram. Likewise, Outram was the feeder school to Raffles Institution. The working arrangement between Pearl's Hill School and Outram School continued up to January 1953 whereas the working agreement between Outram and Raffles Institution ceased with the Japanese occupation of Singapore in February 1942. After the war, Outram boys competed with other government primary school pupils in securing places in government secondary schools.

Under the orders of the Education Department, SG Mohamed Ghows, who was Outram's principal in 1941, sent all Outram School's records to the Pasir Panjang English School for safekeeping. Subsequently, this school suffered a direct hit during World War II, and with it went all Outram's records, from 1906 to 1942.

On 1 January 1954, Outram School ceased to be a purely primary school and was converted to a four-year secondary commercial school with a four-year secondary school course leading to the School Certificate of Commercial Education of the London Chamber of Commerce. With the conversion, the school motto was changed from "On to Success" to "Labor Omnia Vincit" – Labour Conquers All. The school's crest was also changed.

Outram Secondary School moved to the site at 10 Winstedt Road in June 1994 to make way for the redevelopment of new premises at York Hill, and moved back in 1998, before the opening on 28 August 1999.

In 2024, the Ministry of Education (Singapore) announced that Outram Secondary School would move to Sengkang. It was later confirmed to be at 48 Anchorvale Crescent. It is Singapore's first zero-energy school, relying solely on 1,340 solar panels to power the school.

== Notable alumni ==
- Wee Kim Wee – 4th President of Singapore
- Wong Kan Seng – Former Deputy Prime Minister of Singapore
- Gan Thiam Poh – Member of Parliament
- James Koh - former chairman of the Urban Redevelopment Authority and the Housing and Development Board
- Gurmit Singh – Singaporean comedian, television presenter and actor
- Irene Ang – Singaporean comedian and businesswoman
