= Peter Ong =

Singaporean civil servant

Peter Ong Boon Kwee DUBC PJG (Chinese: 王文辉) is a Singaporean civil servant, and the chairman of Enterprise Singapore. He was the Head of the Civil Service from 2010 to 2017.

Ong received a Colombo Plan Scholarship for his tertiary education, earning a degree in economics with honours from Lincoln College, University of Adelaide in 1983. He received his MBA from Stanford University in 1993.

Ong has previously held the positions of Permanent Secretary of the Ministry of Finance, Permanent Secretary of National Security and Intelligence Co-ordination, Permanent Secretary of the Ministry of Trade and Industry, Permanent Secretary of the Ministry of Transport, and Second-Permanent-Secretary of the Ministry of Defence from 2001 to 2002. Prior to that, he was an executive vice president of Temasek Holdings from 1998 to 2000. He is also the former chairman of the Board of the Maritime and Port Authority and the Accounting and Corporate Regulatory Authority, 2009-2010.

Ong currently is on the boards of directors of the Monetary Authority of Singapore, the National Research Foundation Singapore and AMRO, the ASEAN+3 Macroeconomic and Research Office.

He was the Chairman of the Inland Revenue Authority of Singapore from 2009 to 2016. He is also chairman of the board for the Calvary Community Care charity. Since 2010 he has been on the board of Singapore Telecommunications Ltd.

As head of the Civil Service, Ong took a tough stand on corruption, saying that the authorities "will not hesitate to take action against a corrupt officer, no matter how senior he or she might be." During the severe smoke and haze conditions in the summer of 2013, Ong ensured that government employees were “haze-ready” and that government operations continued despite the atmospheric conditions.

Ong is a believer in well-designed programs to achieve government and societal goals, and recently has been stressing the importance of dealing appropriately with the diversity of peoples’ needs, and multifaceted solutions.

== Honours ==
- In 2010, Ong received the Meritorious Service Medal (Pingat Jasa Gemilang) at the Singapore National Day Awards.
- Distinguished Service Order, in 2024.

=== Foreign honour ===
- Malaysia : Honorary Commander of the Order of Loyalty to the Crown of Malaysia (P.S.M.) (2012)
