= Choo Siu Heng =

- Born: 1930; Johor, Malaysia
- Died: 12 September 2011 (aged 80–81); Singapore
- Resting place: Choa Chu Kang Cemetery
- Years active: 1956-1991
- Political party: People’s Action Party
- Spouse: Liem Bik Lu
- Children: 4
- Honours: Bintang Bakti Masyarakat; Pingat Bakti Masyarakat; Pingat Bakti Setia

Choo Siu Heng (Chinese: 朱秀兴; 1930 – 12 September 2011) was a Singaporean political activist with the People's Action Party (PAP) for 55 years. He joined the party in 1956, though he was soon arrested and deported to China by the government for being pro-Communist. Choo returned to Singapore in 1962 and was part of the PAP Ulu Pandan branch, which he chaired in from 1968 to 1991.

== Early life and education ==
Choo was born in Johor, Malaysia in 1930.

== Career ==
Choo joined the PAP in 1956 to fight for independence for Singapore. He began serving as the secretary of the party's Bukit Timah branch. However, a year later, he was among several activists detained in the Changi Prison by the Lim Yew Hock government for being pro-Communist. In September 1958, Choo was deported to a farm in Guangzhou, China. While PAP came into power following the 1959 Singaporean general election, Choo only returned to Singapore in December 1962, after which he began working for the party's Ulu Pandan branch.

In 1966, Choo was placed in charge of the accounts of the party's headquarters, a responsibility he continued to hold until 1985. Choo was made the chairman of the Ulu Pandan branch in 1968, remaining in the position until 1991. In June 1973, he became a member of the Ulu Pandan Citizens' Consultative Committee.

Choo was awarded the Bintang Bakti Masyarakat in 1974. In 1977, he began serving as the chairman of the Ghim Moh Community Centre Management Committee. In 1978, he was awarded the Pingat Bakti Masyarakat. From March 1982 to March 1989, he was an honorary patron of the Ulu Pandan Community Centre Management Committee. He became the Vice-Chairman of the Ulu Pandan Citizens' Consultative Committee in November 1983 and remained in this position until October 1987. In 1983, Choo received the Long Service Certificate, which was followed by the Pingat Bakti Setia in the following year. He again received the Bintang Bakti Masyarakat in 1985. By then, he had become a restaurant owner, a community leader in the Ulu Pandan area, and an advisor to several trade associations, including the Ghim Moh Market and Shop Merchants' Association and the Singapore Taxi Drivers' Association. He also sat on several committees, including the Ulu Pandan scholarship fund. He was the owner of the bookstore of the Ghim Moh Primary School. In 1987, he received the Ministry of Community Development Awards for his community work.

== Personal life and death ==
Choo married Liem Bik Lu, with whom he had four children. In early August 2011, Choo was admitted to hospital and diagnosed with cancer. After learning that he had weeks to live, he asked to be discharged. Choo died on 12 September, after which he was buried at the Choa Chu Kang Christian Cemetery. Following his death, Prime Minister Lee Hsien Loong sent Choo’s wife a letter of condolence. On 24 November 2012, Lee launched the Choo Siu Heng Scholarship in honour of him.
