= President's Scholar =

Academic scholarship in Singapore

A President's Scholar is a recipient of the academic scholarship awarded by the Government of Singapore annually, to pursue undergraduate education at a university, usually abroad. The scholarship is considered to be the most prestigious public undergraduate scholarship in Singapore awarded to students of Singaporean nationality.

All recipients have legal obligation to serve a bond—in the form of a public service career for a certain period of time, usually ranging from 4 to 6 years, after completing his or her studies in the university.

Shortlisted candidates are interviewed by a selection committee chaired by the Chairman of the Public Service Commission (PSC) of Singapore.

The President's Scholarship by itself does not award any money or lead to any particular career in public service. As such, it is generally paired with another scholarship, which could be either of the following:

- The SAF Scholarship
- The SPF Scholarship
- The PSC Scholarship

== History ==
The President's Scholarship has its roots in the Queen's Scholarship, which was founded in 1885. The Queen's Scholarship was initiated by Cecil Clementi Smith, Governor of the Straits Settlements. It was awarded to the best performing student of the year by a special selection board.

The Queen's Scholarship was abolished in 1959 and replaced by the Singapore State Scholarship when Singapore gained self-governance.

In August 1964, the Yang di-Pertuan Negara Scholarship was inaugurated to replace the State Scholarship.

In 1966, after Singapore achieved independence, the Yang di-Pertuan Negara Scholarship was renamed the President's Scholarship.

== Recipients ==
Many recipients of the President's Scholarship went on to serve in top positions in the civil service.

According to statistics collected by the newspaper The Straits Times, the schools in Singapore having the highest number of President's Scholars among their alumni are as follows:

School	Number of President's Scholars
Raffles Institution	96
Hwa Chong Institution	65
National Junior College	45

Notable recipients of the President's Scholarship
Name	Year received	Remarks	Ref
Politics
Lim Boon Keng	1887	Member, British Legislative Council	
Edmund W. Barker	1946	Former Cabinet Minister (1964–1988)	
Tony Tan	1959	7th President of Singapore (2011–2017)	
Lee Yock Suan	1966	Former Cabinet Minister (1987–2004)	
Mah Bow Tan	1967	Former Cabinet Minister (1991–2011)	
Yeo Ning Hong		Former Cabinet Minister	
Lee Hsien Loong	1970	Senior Minister	
Teo Chee Hean	1973	Senior Minister	
George Yeo	1973	Former Cabinet Minister (1991–2011)	
Chan Soo Sen	1975	Former Member of Parliament (1997–2011)	
Lim Hng Kiang	1973	Former Cabinet Minister	
Vivian Balakrishnan	1980	Minister for Foreign Affairs	
Chan Chun Sing	1988	Minister for Defence	
Sim Ann	1994	Second Minister for Foreign Affairs and Home Affairs.	
David Lim		Former Member of Parliament	
Tsao Yuan		Former Nominated Member of Parliament	
Public Sector
Ahmad Mohamed Ibrahim	1936	Former Attorney-General of Singapore	
Lim Siong Guan	1965	Group President of the Government of Singapore Investment Corporation	
James Koh Cher Siang	1965	Chairman, Housing and Development Board	
Barry Desker	1966	Dean, S. Rajaratnam School of International Studies	
Su Guaning	1967	Former President, Nanyang Technological University (2003–2011)	
Kishore Mahbubani	1967	Former Dean, Lee Kuan Yew School of Public Policy	
Chan Seng Onn	1973	Supreme Court Judge	
Lee Wei Ling	1973	Senior Advisor, National Neuroscience Institute	
Ivan Png Paak Liang	1975	Vice-Provost, National University of Singapore (2001–2003)	
Ng Chee Khern	1984	Permanent Secretary (Strategy), Prime Minister's Office	
Ng Chee Peng	1989	Former CEO, Central Provident Fund Board	
Hoo Sheau Peng	1989	Supreme Court Judge	
Lim Cheng Yeow Perry	1991	Former Chief of Defence Force, Singapore Armed Forces	
Lim Tuang Liang	1991	Former Chief of Air Force, Singapore Armed Forces	
Lai Chung Han	1992	Permanent Secretary (Development), Ministry of Education	
Chong Tow Chong		Provost, Singapore University of Technology and Design	
Tan Kai Hoe	1985	Former Chief of Staff, Republic of Singapore Navy (RSN)	
Goh Si Hou	1997	Former Chief of Army, Singapore Armed Forces	
Aaron Beng	2000	Chief of Defence Force	
Private Sector
Kwa Geok Choo		Former Lawyer	
Mohamed Ismail bin Ibrahim	1968	First Malay President's Scholar	
Ho Ching	1972	Former CEO, Temasek Holdings	
Lee Hsien Yang	1976	Former CEO of Singapore Telecommunications Limited.	
Shaun Seow		Former CEO, MediaCorp	
Alan Chan		Former CEO, Singapore Press Holdings Limited	
Low Sin Leng		Executive chairman, Sembcorp Development	
Gan Juay Kiat	1976	Former CEO, SBS Transit	
