= Alan Chan =

Singaporean civil servant (born 1953)

Alan Chan Heng Loon DUBC PJG PPA(E) PPA(P)
- Born: 22 February 1953 (age 73); Singapore
- Citizenship: Singapore
- Education: INSEAD (MBA); École nationale de l'aviation civile (Dipl. Ing.)
- Children: 2

Alan Chan Heng Loon DUBC PJG PPA(E) PPA(P) (born 22 February 1953) is a former Singaporean civil servant. He was the former chief executive of the Singapore Press Holdings.

== Early life ==
Chan was born to a bilingual family fluent in English and Chinese. He studied in Haig Boys School, Raffles Institution and National Junior College. He was awarded the President's Scholarship and French Government Scholarship, and graduated with a Dip Ingenieur from Ecole Nationale de L'Aviation Civile in 1978. He subsequently went to INSEAD and obtained an MBA in 1983.

== Career ==
After studying in France, Chan worked as a civil servant under various Singaporean government ministries. Chan served as the Ministry of Defence’s Director of Manpower. In 1994 Chan successfully applied to be the Principal Private Secretary of then Senior Minister Lee Kuan Yew. Thereafter, Chan was appointed as Deputy Secretary at the Ministry of Foreign Affairs. Strict on making his subordinates speak Chinese properly, he imposed a ten-cent fine on whoever who used English terms in their Chinese conversations. Chan later contributed an essay titled "My Tryst With Chinese" to Lee's 2012 book, My Lifelong Challenge: Singapore's Bilingual Journey. Before retiring from the civil service, he rose to the position of Permanent Secretary of the Ministry of Communications and Information and the Ministry of Transport. In total, Chan's career as a government official spanned some 25 years.

Chan became Group President of media firm Singapore Press Holdings (SPH) in July 2002. In January 2003, he became the Singapore-based company's chief executive officer. He was also part of its board of directors. Chan retired from SPH on 1 September 2017.

He was appointed Chairman of the Land Transport Authority on 1 April 2016.

Listed as one of "100 Inspiring Rafflesians" in 2008, Chan was selected by INSEAD in 2009 as one of the "50 Alumni who changed the world".

== Personal life ==
Chan is married with two children, a boy and a girl. Chan has three older siblings. His brother Heng Wing was Ambassador to Thailand, and one of his sisters, Heng Chee was Ambassador to the United States.

== Awards and decorations ==
- Distinguished Service Order, in 2026.
- Meritorious Service Medal, in 2012.
- Public Administration Medal (Gold), in 2002.
- Public Administration Medal (Silver).
