= Tay Seow Huah =

Singaporean civil servant

Tay Seow Huah PJG

Personal details
- Born: 1933 Penang, Straits Settlements
- Died: 19 September 1980 (aged 46–47) London, United Kingdom
- Spouse: Cecilia Cheong Keong Hin
- Children: 2
- Education: University of Malaya in Singapore (BA)

Chinese name
- Traditional Chinese: 戴少華
- Simplified Chinese: 戴少华
Transcriptions
Standard Mandarin
- Hanyu Pinyin: Dài Shǎohuá
- IPA: [tâɪ.ʂàʊ.xwǎ]

Tay Seow Huah PJG (c. 1933– 19 September 1980) was a Singaporean senior civil servant who served at various times as Director of the Special Branch, Director of the Security and Intelligence Division, Permanent Secretary for Home Affairs and Permanent Secretary for Defence, prior to his retirement in 1976. He then taught history at the University of Singapore.

== Early life and education ==
Tay was born in Penang, and he attended the University of Malaya in Singapore to study history. Tay graduated with a Bachelor of Arts.

== Career ==
Tay was awarded the Eisenhower Fellowships in 1971. He was Acting Permanent Secretary of Home Affairs around 1971 and was involved in the Laju incident.

In February 1973, Tay was appointed as deputy chairman on a public inquiry committee into juvenile crime, assisting chairman Tan Boon Chiang.

On 1 April 1976, Tay retired from the civil service on medical grounds.

== Personal life ==
Tay was married to Cecilia Cheong Keong Hin, and they had two children—Joanne Tay and Simon Tay.

In 1974, after being hospitalised in Tan Tock Seng Hospital due to a cardiovascular disease, Tay went to the United States to seek medical treatment.

On 19 September 1980, Tay died. He was undergoing an operation in a London hospital to remove a brain tumour, and fell into a coma.

== Legacy ==
In December 2000, the Tay Seow Huah Book Prize was set up by his children, relatives, friends, and former colleagues, including President S. R. Nathan.

In 2024, his son released a memoir about him:

- Tay, Simon (3 October 2024). Enigmas: Tay Seow Huah, My Father, Singapore's Pioneer Spy Chief. Singapore: Landmark Books. ISBN 978-981-188-806-9.

== Awards and decorations ==
- Meritorious Service Medal, in 1967.
