= National Security Coordination Secretariat =

Unit of the Government of Singapore

The National Security Coordination Secretariat (NSCS) is a unit under the Prime Minister's Office (PMO) of the Government of Singapore. Established in 1999, it was tasked to strengthen coordination amongst Singapore's existing security agencies; Singapore Armed Forces (SAF), Singapore Police Force (SPF), Internal Security Department (ISD) and Security and Intelligence Division (SID).

== History ==
In 1999, the National Security Secretariat (NSS) was set up to forge and strengthen inter-agency links through the strategic convergence of these organisations and other relevant government ministries, directing efforts against the emerging threats of non-conventional warfare and transnational terrorism.

With the advent of the terrorist incidents taking place in the United States on 11 September 2001, the NSS was responsible for implementing several ad hoc coordinating arrangements to protect Singapore from subsequent attacks.

These ad hoc coordinating arrangements were known to relate to areas in terms of aviation, land transport and maritime security. It is possible that through the work of the NSS, the Singapore Armed Forces (SAF) began researching into rearranging itself into a task based force structure, with a dedicated focus in a new operational area of homeland defence. Following the 9/11, SAF soldiers began to be deployed to Key Installation sites, known as KINS, in support of the Ministry of Home Affairs (MHA). These areas cover Changi International Airport, Sembawang Wharves, and the oil refineries situated on Jurong Island.

The SAF and Singapore Civil Defence Force (SCDF) also began parallel efforts to develop measures to counter chemical and biological warfare. With the SAF, a battalion equivalent of forces commenced development of the CBRE group—Chemical Biological Radiological and Explosives ordnance group, which was rightfully an expansion of its chemical warfare capability. The SCDF strengthened the development of its HAZMAT—Hazardous Material forces.

Ad hoc arrangements gradually became regarded as insufficient to meet the new security landscape, and the NSS recognised that there was a crucial need for not merely the security agencies, but rather all ministries to work together to develop a whole-of-government approach towards handling modern day security threats.

From 2003 onward, it was decided that formulating relevant security policy and implementing integrated and coordinated approaches would be best done through a small coordination unit that was managed at the prime minister's level–as such the NSS would be headed at the Prime Minister's Office (PMO).

On 20 July 2004, Deputy Prime Minister Tony Tan laid out the case for a new Strategic Framework for national security in Parliament. This framework sought to address the issues and close the gaps identified, and put in place the machinery to enable the government to systematically deal with the security issues confronting Singapore. Included within the framework was the plan to re-describe the NSS as the National Security Coordination Secretariat (NSCS)—which was established under the PMO and tasked with national security planning and the coordination of policy and intelligence issues. The NSS was renamed the National Security Coordination Centre (NSCC) and together with the Joint Counter Terrorism Centre (JCTC) formed up the NSCS.

== Structure ==
The NSCS consists of the following departments:

- Geopolitical Security
- Resilience Security
- Civil Security
- National Security Risk Planning
