= Simon Tay =

Singaporean lawyer

His Excellency Simon Tay
- 戴尚志
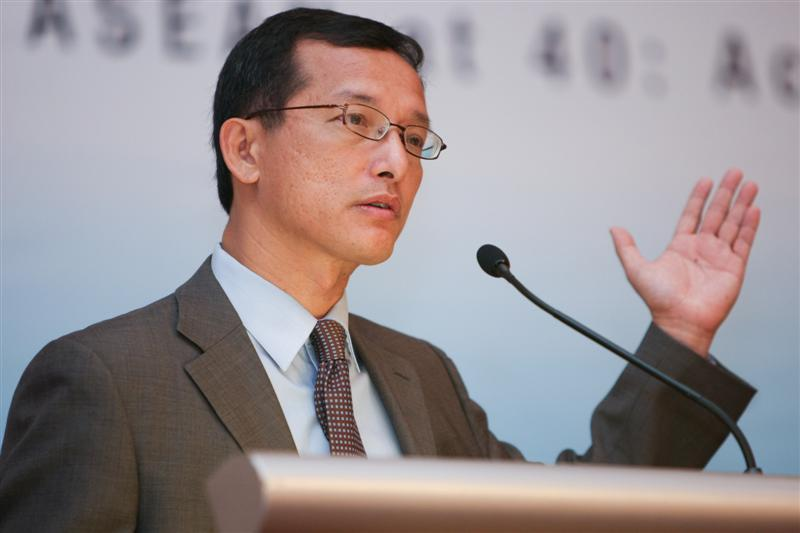
- Tay speaking at the ASEAN Think Tank Forum 2007
- Born: Simon Tay Seong Chee; 4 January 1961 (age 65); State of Singapore
- Education: National University of Singapore (LLB); Harvard University (LLM)
- Children: 1
- Parent: Tay Seow Huah (father)

Simon Tay Seong Chee (Note: Chinese: 戴尚志; Pe̍h-ōe-jī: Tè Siōng-chì; pinyin: Dài Shàngzhì) (born 4 January 1961) is a Singaporean lawyer and legal academic who served as a Nominated Member of Parliament between 1997 and 2003.

== Early life and education ==
Tay was born on 4 January 1961 in Singapore. His father, Tay Seow Huah, was a senior civil servant.

Tay graduated from the National University of Singapore in 1986 with a Bachelor of Laws with honours degree. During his time as an undergraduate, Tay served as the president of the NUS Students' Union for three terms.

In 1993, Tay went on to pursue a Master of Laws degree at Harvard University as a Fulbright Scholar. There, he won the Laylin Prize in 1994 for the best graduate paper in Public International Law.

== Career ==
=== 1986–1995 ===
From 1986 to 1991, Tay began his career as a lawyer with Shook Lin & Bok, Advocates & Solicitors. There, he specialised in corporate litigation, advising corporate clients, including major banks and property companies.

In 1989, Tay was also a columnist for The Sunday Times newspaper for two years. In 1991, Tay started the Singapore Volunteers Overseas (now Singapore International Volunteers) with the Singapore International Foundation, which recruits young volunteers to provide technical assistance in developing countries.

In 1995, Tay was on the board of directors of the non-governmental, Singapore Environment Council. He remained on the board for eight years.

=== 1995 – early 2000s ===
In 1997, Tay, nominated by the public, was selected by a special Parliamentary committee and appointed by the president of Singapore to serve in Parliament as one of nine non-elected and independent Members of Parliament. During his time as a Nominated Member of Parliament (NMP), Tay focused on issues relating to civil society, environment and human rights. On 30 June 1998, Tay moved a motion in Parliament pertaining to the haze pollution. The motion appealed for the government to do more to help control and prevent fires in Indonesia, which impacted Singapore with haze pollution, and affected the region's environment, human health and economic activity. The motion was supported by NMP Zulkifli bin Baharudin, as well as MP Yeo Cheow Tong, former Minister for Health and Minister for the Environment. Tay continued to serve as a NMP until 2003, for a record three terms. In 1998, Tay was appointed by the prime minister to lead a public consultation, known as the Singapore 21, on the future needs and aspirations of Singapore in the future. He was part of the Main Committee of 11 Members of Parliament and was also the co-chair of the committee on "Consultation and Consensus vs Decisiveness and Quick Action". In 1999, Tay took up the position of Chairman of the Singapore Institute of International Affairs. With the SIIA, Tay went to Jakarta on a fact-finding mission for solutions to the forest fires and the haze. The mission aimed to find out how NGOs from the region can work together to find a possible solution.

== 2000–present ==
Tay was named a "global leader of tomorrow" during the 2000 World Economic Forum in Davos, Switzerland in addition to being featured in the Far Eastern Economic Review as one of 'Ten People to Watch in Asia'.

From 2002 to 2008, Tay chaired the National Environment Agency of Singapore, the country's main agency for environmental protection and public health. In 2006, he received the Public Service Medal (Pingat Bakti Masyarakat, PBM) from the Singapore government, a National Day Award. In 2009, Tay spent a year in New York as a Bernard Schwartz Fellow. Tay formerly taught at Harvard Law School, Yale and the Fletcher School of Tufts University as a visiting professor.

Tay is currently associate professor of law at the National University of Singapore, Chairman of the Singapore Institute of International Affairs (an independent think tank) and Senior Consultant at WongPartnership LLP, a leading Asian law firm. Appointed by the Singapore Government, Tay currently serves as an Eminent Person for the ASEAN Regional Forum, Eminent Expert To the International Advisory Panel on Transboundary Pollution, and on the National Climate Change Network. Tay writes fortnightly commentaries in TODAY, a Singaporean newspaper, and monthly columns in The Peak Singapore, a lifestyle magazine title. His columns are also featured in other Asian newspapers such as Hong Kong's South China Morning Post, Thailand's Nation and Indonesia's Jakarta Post. He appears regularly in American and international media, including BBC, CNN, and Bloomberg.

He is one of the editors of the Asian Journal of International Law.

Apart from his academic and political interests Tay is a poet and author. His 2009 non-fiction book Asia Alone: The Dangerous Post-Crisis Divide from America was reviewed by The Economist and The Financial Times. His novel City of Small Blessings won the 2010 Singapore Literature Prize. His collection of short stories, Stand Alone, was awarded the Highly Commended prize from the National Book Development Council of Singapore Awards.

== Selected writings ==
=== Non-fiction ===
- — (2010). Asia Alone: The Dangerous Post-Crisis Divide From America. John Wiley and Sons. ISBN 978-0-470-82582-2.
- —; Hwee, Yeo Lay, eds. (2006). Elections in Asia: Making Democracy Work?. Singapore: Marshall Cavendish Academic. ISBN 978-981-210-448-9. OCLC 174250139.
- Simon Tay, Jesus P. Estanislao & Hadi Soesastro (eds.), Reinventing ASEAN, Institute of Southeast Asian Studies, 2001 ISBN 981-230-147-X
- Simon Tay, Alien Asian: A Singaporean in America, Singapore, 1997, ISBN 978-981-3065-08-6

=== Fiction ===
- Simon Tay, City of Small Blessings, Landmark Books, Singapore, 2009, ISBN 978-981-4189-19-4
- Simon Tay, Stand Alone, Singapore, 1991, ISBN 981-3002-41-7
- Simon Tay, 5, National University of Singapore Press, Singapore, 1985
