= Internal Security Department (Singapore) =

Intelligence Agency in Singapore

Internal Security Department (ISD)
- Logo of the Internal Security Department

Agency overview
- Formed: 1948; 78 years ago (as the Singapore Special Branch)
- Preceding agency: Malayan Security Service (1939–1948)
- Jurisdiction: Government of Singapore
- Headquarters: New Phoenix Park, 30 Irrawaddy Road, Singapore
- Employees: Classified
- Annual budget: Classified
- Minister responsible: K. Shanmugam, Minister for Home Affairs
- Agency executive: Classified, Director, ISD
- Parent agency: Ministry of Home Affairs
- Website: mha.gov.sg/isd
- Agency ID: T08GA0034L

The Internal Security Department (ISD) is the principal security agency and domestic intelligence service of Singapore. The department is tasked with collecting and analysing intelligence, making assessments, and taking executive actions to counter national security threats to the country's sovereignty, safety, and stability. As a counter-intelligence and counter-terrorism organisation, the ISD is responsible for protecting Singapore from espionage or spying, foreign interference, covert operations, subversion, terrorism, organised crime, and political, racial or religious extremism.

The ISD is empowered to conduct mass surveillance and covert security operations. It also has the utmost right to indefinitely detain individuals without trial, when a suspect is believed to be a threat to Singapore's national security.

== History ==
The department was initially established as the Criminal Intelligence Department in 1918 after the Sepoy Mutiny of 1915. In 1933, the CID was renamed as Special Branch.

In 1939, it was restructured into the Malayan Security Service (MSS) which was not yet fully operational by the time of the outbreak of the Second World War. The MSS was disrupted by the Japanese invasion and subsequent occupation of Singapore and Malaya. It was disbanded in 1948 and two secret branches, one in Singapore and the other in Malaysia, were created.

The Singapore Special Branch (SSB) was first established on 23 August 1948 by the British colonial government, after the CPM launched an armed uprising through the Malayan National Liberation Army (MNLA) to establish a communist state in what became known as the Malayan Emergency. It was structured under the Singapore Police Force and headed by a Deputy Commissioner. During the 12-year uprising, the SSB worked in cooperation with its British and Malayan counterparts to counter MNLA activities by rooting out armed cells and CPM agents embedded within various civil organisations such as trade unions. Such activities continued following the end of the uprising; a covert security operation in 1963, known as Operation Coldstore, led to the detention of 113 suspected subversives.

During the 1950s and 1960s, it was also known as the Internal Security Council (ISC). After Singapore became independent in 1965, the SSB/ISC was restructured and renamed the Internal Security Department (ISD), becoming a separate agency on 17 February 1966, together with its foreign counterpart, the Security and Intelligence Division (SID). Both agencies operated under the former Ministry of Interior and Defence until 11 August 1970, when the ministry was split into the Defence (MINDEF) and Home Affairs (MHA) ministries, with SID and ISD falling under them respectively.

Commenting on the battle against the Communist Party of Malaya (CPM), then Deputy Prime Minister Goh Keng Swee stated that an "efficient secret police" was necessary to counter dangers such as insurgencies and violent rebellions in the country.

=== Notable incidents ===
==== 1960 CIA plot ====
From 1960 to 1961, the Central Intelligence Agency (CIA) attempted to recruit Yoong Siew Wah, an inspector in the SSB, as a mole to provide them with sensitive security intelligence for the United States. Prime Minister Lee Kuan Yew authorised an operation with Wah playing along with the CIA as a triple agent. While meeting CIA officers in a safe house, SSB agents, which had been earlier deployed around the house, moved in to make arrests.

Two polygraphers managed to escape in a car leading to a car chase which ended in their arrest and the seizure of a polygraph machine. A CIA officer working under the cover of an embassy First Secretary was declared persona-non-grata and expelled from Singapore. Lee was personally offered with US$3.3 million to him and his political party, People's Action Party, to cover up the matter but he rejected it and demanded US$33 million in economic aid instead. Dean Rusk, then U.S. Secretary of State, formally acknowledged the affair and apologised in a letter.

In 1965, during a televised interview with foreign correspondents about the British bases in Singapore, Lee revealed the CIA plot. After the broadcast, James D. Bell, U.S. ambassador to Malaysia, and the State Department officially denied the incident, leading a furious Lee to display the letter from Rusk to correspondents as evidence. Lee also threatened to broadcast tape recordings proving the charge. The denials were eventually withdrawn with a closed congressional record suggesting that the State Department and the ambassador were both unaware of the case as newer officials had failed to consult the files.

==== Jemaah Islamiyah operations in Singapore ====
In the late 1980s, the Jemaah Islamiyah (JI) created a Singapore branch with Haji Ibrahim bin Haji Maidin as the leader of the Singapore branch. Ibrahim recruited members through religious classes which he conducted at private residences. The Singapore branch had an estimated 60 to 80 members in a 2002 estimate by the ISD.

JI aimed to establish a dawlah islāmiyyah (Islamic state) in Southeast Asia and planned a series of attacks to occur in the aftermath of the September 11 attacks against the United States. Close to 80 targets were identified with plans to bomb a shuttle bus ferrying American military personnel and their families from Sembawang to Yishun MRT station. Other targets included key military installations like the MINDEF Headquarters at Bukit Gombak, the Singapore Ministry of Education, U.S. and Israeli Embassies, British and Australian High Commissions, the Singapore American School, and commercial buildings housing US firms.

Primarily, JI scheduled major coordinated attacks against the American and Israeli embassies; the Australian and British high commissions, the Singapore American School, Sembawang Wharf and Changi Naval Base, as well as commercial buildings hosting American multinational companies. The plotters had made arrangements to procure 17 tonnes of ammonium nitrate, 6 tonnes of trinitrotoluene (TNT), 300 pieces of detonators, 2.4 km of detonator cord, and six trucks (to be filled with the explosives).

In 2001, Ibrahim was arrested by ISD. ISD was then informed that another Singaporean, Mohammad Aslam Yar Ali Khan, had links to Al-Qaeda. In December, the ISD arrested 15 people under the Internal Security Act for terrorism-related activities. 13 of the arrested people were determined to be JI members and were served with Orders of Detention. The other two non-JI members were released on Restriction Orders. Aslam would later be arrested by the Northern Alliance in Afghanistan. In 2002, a review of the cases 13 detainees was done by an independent advisory board. The subsequent report by the board supported the ISD's detention of the JI members. In August, ISD arrested 21 Singaporeans which consisted of 19 JI members and 2 Moro Islamic Liberation Front members. Out of the 21, 18 were detained while the remaining three were released on Restriction Orders.

In 2023, during the ISD's 75th Anniversary Gala Dinner, Prime Minister Lee Hsien Loong, in his speech, pointed out one of ISD's first female Operations officers, "Tiger Lily", who was instrumental in breaking into the Singapore JI network. She had managed to get close to the JI Muslimah, wives of JI members, and subsequently through them to persuade their husbands to reveal their JI involvement and cooperate with ISD investigations.

=== Joint Counter Terrorism Centre ===
In 2004, the Joint Counter-Terrorism Centre (JCTC) was set up under the National Security Coordination Secretariat (NSCS) of the Prime Minister's Office (PMO) to deal with security threats and terrorism. This meant that the SID and the ISD, which previously worked independent of each other, had to share information for the first time.

== Legislation ==
The powers of investigation and arrest of the ISD are regulated by several laws, including:

- Internal Security Act
- Official Secrets Act
- Criminal Procedure Code
- Maintenance of Religious Harmony Act
- Foreign Interference (Countermeasures) Act

== Organisation ==
Although the agency falls under the Ministry of Home Affairs (MHA), it is autonomous within the ministry. It is led by a director, who holds the rank equivalent to a permanent secretary, and reports directly to the Prime Minister's Office (PMO). The department is highly secretive; most of its personnel are only known to the country's top government officials.

=== Directors ===
The following is a list of former directors of the Internal Security Department. The identity of the director is not conspicuously made known to the public, until they relinquish the post.

| Name | In office | Notes | References |
|---|---|---|---|
| George Bogaars | 1961–1966 | | |
| Tay Seow Huah | 1965–? | | |
| Yoong Siew Wah | 1971–1974 | | |
| Wang Hsu Chih | 1974–1975 | (acting) | |
| Lim Chye Heng | 1975–1982 | | |
| Eddie Teo | 1982–1986 | | |
| Tjong Yik Min | 1986–1993 | | |
| Chiang Chie Foo | 1993–1997 | | |
| Benny Lim Siang Hoe | 1997–2004 | | |
| Pang Kin Keong | 2004–2010 | | |
| Loh Ngai Seng | 2010–2016 | | |
| Tai Wei Shyong | 2016–2020 | | |
| Tan Chye Hee | 2020–2025 | | |

== See also ==
- Security and Intelligence Division, the foreign intelligence service of Singapore
