= AMRO =

ASEAN-related body

The ASEAN+3 Macroeconomic and Research Office, abbreviated as AMRO, is an international institution that supports the ASEAN Plus Three group with surveillance, analysis and research. It is based in Singapore. It plays a prominent role in macroeconomic and financial surveillance in the region, in complementarity with the International Monetary Fund at the global level.

== Overview ==
The establishment of AMRO has been part of Asia's collective response to the 1997 Asian financial crisis. The ASEAN+3 Finance Ministers established the Chiang Mai Initiative in May 2000, then upgraded it to Chiang Mai Initiative-Multilateral (CMIM) in March 2010. They then established AMRO in April 2011 to conduct macroeconomic surveillance in support to CMI-M. AMRO was subsequently reorganized as a formal international organization, effective 9 February 2016. AMRO's research has been cited as a reference source by economic policy scholars.

== Leadership ==
- Mr Wei Benhua, Director May 2011 - May 2012
- Mr Yoichi Nemoto, Director May 2012 - May 2016
- Ms Chang Junhong, Director May 2016 - May 2019
- Mr Toshinori Doi, Director May 2019 - May 2022
- Mr Li Kouqing, Director May 2022 - May 2025
- Mr Yasuto Watanabe, Director since May 2025

== See also ==
- History of ASEAN
