= Pingat Bakti Setia =

Pingat Bakti Setia (Long Service Award)
- Ribbon
- Type: Medal
- Awarded for: 25 years of service
- Presented by: Singapore
- Eligibility: Any person working in, or associated with, the Singaporean public service
- Status: Active
- Established: 1962
- Ribbon prior to 1996

Precedence
- Next (higher): Pingat Berkebolehan
- Related: Long Service Medal (Military)

The Pingat Bakti Setia (English: Long Service Award) is a Singaporean decoration instituted in 1962. The medal may be awarded to any person who has completed 25 years continuous service in either government related services, in the field of education or military service.

== History ==
The Pingat Bakti Setia was first established in 1962 as part of the first six national awards created in Singapore.

== Requirements ==
The medal may be awarded to any person who has completed 25 years continuous service in:

- the Government.
- any statutory authority (other than a Town Council).
- any organisation, association or body rendering services in the field of education.
- any company which is wholly owned by the Government and which is carrying on business mainly as an agent or instrumentality of the Government, and who is of irreproachable character.
- the Singapore Armed Forces. The award will be followed by (Tentera), Malay for "Army", signifying the awardee's association.

== Description ==
- The medal, in silver, consists of a multi-lobed disc having, on the obverse side, a circular shield bearing a crescent and 5 stars encircled by a scalloped embellishment.
- The reverse bears the State Arms and name of the medal.
- The ribbon is grey with a red centre band and a red stripe to each side.

== Notable recipients ==
- Winston Choo
- Elizabeth Choy
- Bilahari Kausikan
- Soundara Pandian
- Lam Yi Young
- Sivakant Tiwari
- Yeo Kiat Seng
- Alex Abisheganaden
- Choo Siu Heng
