= Singapore Institute of International Affairs =

Singaporean research institute and think tank

- Abbreviation: SIIA
- Formation: 1961
- Type: Research institute, think tank
- Registration no.: S62SS0073L
- Chairman: Simon Tay
- Website: www.siiaonline.org

The Singapore Institute of International Affairs (SIIA) is a Singaporean research institute and think tank which focuses on international relations, especially in ASEAN and the Asia-Pacific (APAC). The Institute conducts research, hosts events, and plans conferences that deal with pressing issues in international affairs. It is the oldest think tank in Singapore, being founded in 1961.

== Overview ==
SIIA is a non-government organization (NGO) and considers itself dedicated to the research, analysis and discussion of regional and international issues. The institute aims to make Singapore a more cosmopolitan and global society through research, policy work and public education on international affairs. It is a membership-based organization.

=== Members ===
The current Chairman of the SIIA is Professor Simon Tay, a professor of law at the National University of Singapore (NUS), and former Chairman of Singapore's National Environment Agency (NEA) Prior to Tay, the SIIA was chaired by Lau Teik Soon, former Member of Parliament who helped organize and implement the ASEAN Institutes of Strategic and International Studies network (ASEAN–ISIS), of which the SIIA is a founding member. In 2005, former Singaporean president S R Nathan became the SIIA’s first Honorary Member.

== Research ==
The SIIA's conducts research for the benefit of its members by working with experts across the spectrum of society, from public officials to academics to businessmen. The goal is to provide insight into a variety of perspectives that span different countries, industries, and interests.

The SIIA has produced numerous influential reports, conferences, and recommendations, such as the recommendation for the ASEAN Regional Forum, now known as the leading forum for multilateral dialogue in Asia regarding security concerns. Other initiatives include recommendations for an ASEAN Economic Community, dialogues for a growing regionalism in East Asia, and an assembly for non-governmental organizations and community groups in ASEAN.

The SIIA also convenes an annual Asia Pacific Roundtable, as well as conferences, symposium and dialogues pertaining to timely, challenging issues.

=== Research Foci ===
Current subjects for research include ASEAN, and Regionalism, as well as extensive work looking at relations between Asian countries and the United States. The SIIA also does work concerning the environment, climate change, and energy issues, and is in the process of organizing a conference that deal with energy security and nuclear energy in August. The Institute has done some work on anti-corruption measures, as well as transparency in government, and continues to support efforts to increase regional and global dialogues on pressing issues.

=== ASEAN–ISIS ===
SIIA was instrumental in the founding of the ASEAN Institute of Strategic and International Studies (ASEAN–ISIS) in Bali in September 1988. The association is the preeminent vehicle for Track II diplomacy in South East Asia. Its purpose is to encourage cooperation, coordination, and engagement among stakeholders and policymakers, as well as scholars and analysts in ASEAN, to work toward the sustained security and stability of South East Asia.

== Events ==
The SIIA holds conferences, events, and conversations with leading members of both the public and private sector relevant to Singapore and the rest of Asia.

Recent speakers include:

- William Cohen, Co-Chairman of the CSIS US ASEAN Strategy Commission.
- Kurt Campbell, US Assistant Secretary of State for East Asian and Pacific Affairs.
- Abdulaziz Aladwani, Ambassador, The Embassy of the State of Kuwait.
