= Richard Lim (disambiguation) =

Richard Lim may refer to:

== People ==
- Richard Soon Huat Lim, Australian politician
- Richard Lim Beng Gee (1951–2016), Singaporean police detective
- Richard Lim Cherng Yih, Singaporean civil servant and former Chief of Navy
