= Edmund Cheng =

Singaporean business leader and arts advocator (born 1952)

Edmund Cheng DUBC PJG BBM(L) BBM

Chairman of the Civil Aviation Authority of Singapore
- In office 1 July 2018 – 1 August 2026
- Preceded by: Lee Hsien Yang
- Succeeded by: Ng Chee Khern

Chairman of the National Arts Council
- In office 1 July 2008 – 31 August 2013
- Preceded by: Liu Thai Ker
- Succeeded by: Chan Heng Chee

Chairman of the Singapore Tourism Board (Note: Known as the Singapore Tourism Promotion Board (STPB) from 1993 to 1997.)
- In office 4 November 1993 – 31 December 2001
- Preceded by: Leong Chee Whye
- Succeeded by: Wee Ee Chao

Personal details
- Born: September 1952 (age 73–74) British Hong Kong
- Spouse: Wong Kit Heng
- Children: 3
- Education: Carnegie Mellon University (MArch); Northwestern University (BSc); Canterbury School

Chinese name
- Traditional Chinese: 鄭維榮
- Simplified Chinese: 郑维荣
- Jyutping: zeng^{6} wai^{4} wing^{4}
- Cantonese Yale: Jehng Wàih-wìhng
Transcriptions
Standard Mandarin
- Hanyu Pinyin: Zhèng Wéiróng
- IPA: [ʈʂə̂ŋ.wěɪ.ɻʊ̌ŋ]
Yue: Cantonese
- Yale Romanization: Jehng Wàih-wìhng
- Jyutping: zeng^{6} wai^{4} wing^{4}

Edmund Cheng Wai Wing (Note: Chinese: see Chinese name and romanisation) (born c. September 1952) is a Singaporean business leader and arts advocator. He is the deputy chairman of Wing Tai Holdings Limited and chairman of Yellow Ribbon Cares and Singapore Art Museum.

Trained as an architect and engineer, Cheng has held chairmanships in the Singapore Tourism Board, (Note: Renamed in 1997 to the Singapore Tourism Board (STB).) Civil Aviation Authority of Singapore, and the National Arts Council.

== Early life and education ==
Cheng was born in British Hong Kong in September 1952. He has 16 siblings, including elder brothers Edgar Cheng and Cheng Wai Keung. His father, Cheng Yik Hung, manufactured garments, and his mother, Chan Lan Yue, was a homemaker.

In 1963, when Cheng's father came to Singapore to build his garment business, Cheng was sent to Canterbury School. After graduating in 1970, he enrolled in Northwestern University. In 1974, Cheng graduated with a Bachelor of Science in civil engineering.

In 1979, Cheng migrated to Singapore. In 1980, he graduated with a Master of Architecture from Carnegie Mellon University.

== Career ==
=== Early career ===
On 11 May 1981, Cheng was appointed as a director of Wing Tai Holdings Limited. (Note: Listed on the Singapore Exchange with ticker W05.) In 1982, he became a registered architect and worked for local architectural firm Architects 61. In 1984, he was promoted to deputy chairman and deputy managing director of Wing Tai.

In July 1988, Cheng was appointed as a board member of the National Fire Prevention Council. He was attributed in 1989 for diversifying Wing Tai, previously centred on garment manufacture, into property management and development, with over S$200 million (1989) (US$102.55 million) worth of projects.

In December 1990, Wing Tai's stock collapsed following rumours of debt servicing problems and the rejection of garments by customers; Cheng called the rumours "malicious and absolutely without substance". He said:

I have no idea who spread the rumours, but I first heard about them last week. It is not fair for people to spread these rumours without checking first with the company. Some people have taken advantage of the situation today and they would have made 20 to 25 per cent in a day if they had bought the share at 75 cents.

In October 1991, following the release of the 2030 Concept Plan by the Urban Redevelopment Authority (URA), Cheng said that he agreed with the plan fully and endorsed one of its goals, which was to decentralise of the Downtown Core by creating four new regional centres.

=== 1993–2001: Singapore Tourism Promotion Board ===
In January 1993, Cheng was appointed as a board member of Raffles Girls' School. In May 1993, following the death of Leong Chee Whye, he was appointed as acting chairman of the Singapore Tourism Promotion Board (STPB). On 4 November 1993, he was confirmed as STPB's chairman.

The next day, Cheng appointed Masaru Yanagisawa as Singapore's first honorary tourism consul. In February 1994, Cheng signed a certificate of affiliation on behalf of STPB with Yanosuke Nunoe, chairman of the Fukuoka Tourism Association, to formalise Singapore as a sister city of Fukuoka.

On 13 March 1995, as STPB chairman, Cheng signed a memorandum of cooperation with the World Travel and Tourism Council, to promote Asia-Pacific tourism projects. In August 1995, following the introduction of six-digit postal codes to identify areas in Singapore, instead of district numbers, Cheng said that the desirability of a property depends on its location, environment, and quality, rather than district numbers. In December 1995, Cheng was approached by Sun Yu-Li, a sculptor, for monetary support to transform a 19th-century church into an art venue, named Sculpture Square. Cheng was appointed as its inaugural chairman.

On 1 June 1996, Cheng was appointed as a non-executive director of Singapore Airlines. In July 1996, he was appointed as chairman of Union Charm Development, a joint-venture company formed by Wing Tai, Temasek Holdings and other companies, (Note: Wing Tai had a 30% stake, and Temasek had a 20% stake. The other companies were Straits Steamship Land (10%), Singapore Land (15%), Lai Sun Developments (10%), Worldwide Investments (7.5%), and USI Holdings (7.5%).) and announced that the joint-venture would bid for all phases of the Union Square development, situated around Kowloon Station.

In February 1997, Cheng announced a summit to attract Japanese tourists to Singapore. He said that the STPB would introduce "aggressive marketing and promotional programmes" in Japan, with industry stakeholders brainstorming ideas for tourism improvement during the summit. In August 1997, during a conference at the World Trade Centre, Cheng invited theme park and attraction operators and developers in Asia-Pacific to establish in Singapore and adapt to "Asian conditions" before setting up elsewhere in the region. He said that theme parks and attractions needed to be credible before gaining popularity. In October 1997, Cheng led a 40-person delegation to Japan to discuss with the Japan Travel Bureau on attracting tourism.

On 22 October 1999, during the official opening of Sculpture Square, Cheng said that the impression of foreigners toward Singapore was "too rigid", and that projects such as Sculpture Square "develop the softer side". He hoped that the venue would export Singaporean art and be visited by the international arts community.

On 31 December 2001, Cheng was succeeded by Wee Ee Chao as chairman of STB.

=== Later career ===
Cheng was appointed as the inaugural chairman of Old Parliament House Limited in January 2003, and DesignSingapore Council in March 2003. In May 2003, Cheng was appointed as chairman of SATS Ltd, replacing Cheong Choong Kong. In September 2003, Cheng said that locals should consider the building's design, apart from its price and location, when purchasing a house. According to him, a building with "a good design" retains its value better, "improves the quality of life", and can be sold quicker. On 24 November 1997, he joined the board of directors for Esplanade, and was appointed chairman on 23 November 2003. That same month, on 1 November 2003, Cheng was also appointed deputy chairman of Mapletree Investments, before being appointed as chairman on 13 April 2004.

In September 2004, Cheng said that landed homes in Singapore should be allowed to be purchased by foreigners. He elaborated that if Singapore wants "to be a world-class city to attract more people", foreigners "must have a stake in the country".

On 1 July 2005, Cheng was appointed as chairman of the National Arts Council, succeeding Liu Thai Ker. Cheng said that Singaporeans "often take the arts for granted" and that "buying tickets to watch art shows" would improve their quality of life. He retired on 31 August 2013 and was replaced by Chan Heng Chee.

On 31 August 2008, Cheng retired as chairman of DesignSingapore Council and was succeeded by Robert Tomlin. In December 2008, he recommended that design-based learning be taught in schools.

On 19 July 2016, Cheng retired as chairman and director of SATS and was succeeded by Euleen Goh Yiu Kiang.

Cheng was appointed as chairman of the Singapore Art Museum in April 2018, and the Civil Aviation Authority of Singapore (CAAS) on 1 July 2018, succeeding Jane Ittogi and Lee Hsien Yang respectively.

On 1 August 2026, Cheng was succeeded by Ng Chee Khern as chairman of CAAS.

== Personal life ==
Cheng is married to Wong Kit Heng, and they have three children.

== Awards and decorations ==
=== National honours ===
- Distinguished Service Order, in 2026.
- Meritorious Service Medal, in 2015.
- Public Service Star (Bar), in 2010.
- Public Service Star, in 1999.

=== Foreign honours ===
- Order of Arts and Letters (Officer), in 2009.
