= 2018 SingHealth data breach =

Patients records were stolen from SingHealth

- Date: 27 June to 4 July 2018
- Duration: 8 days
- Location: Singapore
- Type: Advanced persistent threat
- Cause: Inadequate training of staff, slow fixing of vulnerabilities
- Participants: Unidentified state actors

The 2018 SingHealth data breach was a data breach incident initiated by unidentified state actors, which happened between 27 June and 4 July 2018. During that period, personal particulars of 1.5 million SingHealth patients and records of outpatient dispensed medicines belonging to 160,000 patients were stolen. Names, National Registration Identity Card (NRIC) numbers, addresses, dates of birth, race, and gender of patients who visited specialist outpatient clinics and polyclinics between 1 May 2015 and 4 July 2018 were maliciously accessed and copied. Information relating to patient diagnosis, test results and doctors' notes were unaffected. Information on Prime Minister Lee Hsien Loong was specifically targeted.

== Discovery ==
The database administrators for the Integrated Health Information Systems (IHIS), the public healthcare IT provider, detected unusual activity on one of SingHealth's IT databases on 4 July, and implemented precautions against further intrusions. Network traffic monitoring was enhanced; additional malicious activity was detected after 4 July, but did not result in the theft of any data. Having ascertained that a cyberattack occurred, administrators notified the ministries and brought in the Cyber Security Agency (CSA) on 10 July to carry out forensic investigations. The agency determined that perpetrators gained privileged access to the IT network by compromising a front-end workstation, and obtained login credentials to access the database, while hiding their digital footprints. The attack was made public in a statement released by the Ministry of Communications and Information and Ministry of Health on 20 July. The ten-day delay between the discovery of the attack and the public announcement was attributed to time needed to fortify the IT systems, conduct preliminary investigations, identify affected patients and prepare the logistics of the announcement. Text messages were subsequently sent to patients whose data was affected.

== Investigation ==
On 6 August 2018 in Parliament, Former Minister for Communications and Information, S. Iswaran, attributed the attack to sophisticated state-linked actors who wrote customized malware to circumvent SingHealth's antivirus and security tools. Iswaran did not name any state in the interest of national security.

A Committee of Inquiry was convened on 24 July 2018 to investigate the causes of the attack and identify measures to help prevent similar attacks. The four-member committee is chaired by former chief district judge Richard Magnus, and comprise leaders of a cyber-security firm, a healthcare technology firm and the National Trades Union Congress respectively. The committee called on the Attorney-General's Chambers to lead evidence, and the Attorney-General's Chambers appointed the Cyber Security Agency to lead the investigations with the support of the Criminal Investigation Department. The committee held closed-door and public hearings from 28 August, with another tranche of hearings from 21 September to 5 October. In addition, the Personal Data Protection Commission investigated into possible breaches of the Personal Data Protection Act in protecting data and hence determine possible action.

== Committee of Inquiry hearings ==
The Committee of Inquiry hearings began on 21 September 2018. In the first hearing, Solicitor-General Kwek Mean Luck said that a series of staff missteps and gaps in the system contributed to the breach. Some examples mentioned are the EMR system, which was in place since 1999. In addition, it was mentioned that the cyberattacker behind the incident started infecting workstations as early as August 2017 using a hacking tool. The version of Microsoft Outlook being used did not have a patch that prevents attacks by that hacking tool. Between December 2017 and May 2018, the cyberattacker moved sideways and gained access to a workstation to infect other computers with malware. Other inadequacies identified include not being able to identify multiple failed attempts to log into the system, which was done with non-existent accounts or accounts that do not have much privileges in the system. Eventually, the cyberattacker successfully gained entry through a coding vulnerability on 26 June, and hence sent SQL queries until 4 July when it was stopped by an administrator. In addition, there were three periods where staff failed to respond or responded after a few days when knowledge of the cyberattack was first known. On the same day, two staff members said that while a framework was in place to report cyberattacks, there is insufficient training on what to do, hence it was unclear to staff about what actions should be taken.

At the next hearing on 24 September, it was revealed that Prime Minister Lee Hsien Loong's personal data and outpatient records along with two other unnamed people were searched by hackers who infiltrated into the servers using NRIC numbers. The rest of the queries were generally done on patient demographic data, like one that involved the first 20,000 records of such data from Singapore General Hospital. An assistant lead analyst who detected unusual activity investigated further even through that was not his scope, and sent alerts to different divisions to find the staff who can make sense of those queries. The analyst's supervisor told the analyst to continue monitoring the situation and that he assumed there was no medical data until being informed that there was such a leak. As the analyst informed a reporting officer, there was no point in reporting the query himself, asking the analyst to follow up on the queries. Details about reporting procedures and containment measures were mentioned.

On the third day, a cybersecurity employee at IHiS, who was on holiday when the incident happened, did not follow up after having read the emails as it was thought to have been collection of data from workstations for investigation. In addition, only one computer at IHiS was used to carry out forensic examinations, resulting in delays diagnosing the issue. This is confirmed by the fourth day of the trial, where failings of judgement and organisational processes are exposed. For instance, meetings with the security management department were not conducted regularly, and no framework was created to set out appropriate responses to cybersecurity risks or to appoint covering officers if any staff go on leave. A clarification on processes was provided, where a standard operating procedure to escalate incidents was approved by the management in March 2018. It was also revealed the same day that staffers took six more days after 4 July to confirm the data breach as an IHiS employee mistakenly informed colleagues that no data was stolen, only confirmed after further tests are run by the superior finding that data was stolen. The queries were later recreated.

It was also revealed on the fifth day that a server exploited by hackers did not receive security updates in more than a year since May 2017 due to the WannaCry ransomware attacks, compared to the normal duration where patches were done several times a month. Besides that, the computer's anti-virus software was too old and need to be reinstalled. The manager was not supposed to manage the server on paper, but in practice, was given the role in 2014 as the server was located at the National Cancer Centre Singapore, thereby being convenient for staff members to approach him in case help was needed. Once the counterparts resigned, there was no one at IHiS present to take over managing the server. Also, the IHiS director was not aware that the server was not managed by the firm in practice, only giving a directive in 2014 that IHiS will not manage research servers. The next day, a security loophole that was not plugged was scruntised. Even though the loophole was flagged by an IHiS employee, there was no action taken. In fact, the employee was dismissed after sending details of the flaw to a rival company.

Towards the end of the second tranche of hearings on 5 October, it was revealed a second attempt to hack into the servers was done on 19 July via another server. This was stopped immediately as soon as it began. In addition, malware used was customised for the system and evaded detection from top anti-virus software. A tool called PowerShell was used in the process, being disabled on 13 July. Meanwhile, IHiS stepped up security with changing passwords, removing compromised accounts and rebooting servers.

The third tranche of hearings started on 31 October. Evidence was shown that managers were reluctant to report the incidents as that would mean an increased amount of work, thereby creating a bottleneck. Meanwhile, the chief information officer told the team to escalate the incident, saying a bottleneck is not acceptable, adding that there was no written protocol on how to report SingHealth-related cybersecurity incidents should IHiS staff discover any incident. Another pointed out that annual cybersecurity exercises are mandated for critical information infrastructure (CII) operators, so staff should be able to identify advanced persistent threats (APTs). However, these tests were for classroom settings and may not necessarily apply to the SingHealth case, thus defeating the purpose of these exercises if situational awareness was not there. There were also plans for secure Internet browsing in the healthcare sector by 2018, but it had to be delayed by a year due to technical issues.

The following day, a 2016 audit that found systemic weaknesses in the network link between Singapore General Hospital and cloud-based systems was brought up, showing more inadequacies in the systems managed by IHiS. The incident was reported by the operations team as "plugged" to the management without anyone verifying that works to fix these vulnerabilities were done. The Cyber Security Agency also found similar vulnerabilities in its investigation. Due to this, there will be "three lines of defence", where compliance checks are performed by the operations team, technology team and internal audit team, and training will be stepped up in IHiS so that early detection of attacks are ensured. As pointed out the next day that even if the weaknesses were found, they may not be fixed as quickly as expected as public healthcare institutions operate around the clock resulting in little downtime.

Later in the hearings, SingHealth executives said that they will enhance cyber safety awareness for all employees, as well as roll out new systems to capture patients' data rigorously. It will also allow patients to update their particulars instead of only doing it over the counter. More townhalls will be held to update employees about the latest cyber threats, with log-in messages strengthened to hone the importance of data protection. Storytelling formats will also be used to explain these concepts. More cyber security exercises simulating data breaches were called for in a subsequent hearing, with these allowing professionals to be more familiar with what to do in case a similar incident happens again. In addition, the expert recommended all data within the system to be encrypted including inactive data. As full encryption would be unfeasible due to operational concerns, personal data could be anonymised instead with 2-factor authentication to de-anonymise it. That same hearing, it was updated that many of the written submissions were found to be useful.

Towards the final hearings, a former National Security Agency director suggested having the Government and industry partners work together and share information to learn and update each other about new threats that pop up. That is so as current protection measures are insufficient against ever evolving vulnerabilities. In the same hearing, the Ministry of Health's chief data advisor pointed out that Internet separation resulted in longer wait times for patients, declined productivity, increased staff fatigue and new cyber risks, especially when anti-virus software updates are done only on some computers instead of all within the network. Hence, to continue ISS, these factors would need to be considered. The next day, a security expert recommended having a centralised incident management and tracking system that logs all incidents that occur during a breach to reduce miscommunication, which is one of the causes for delayed reporting. In addition, the usage of different chat platforms meant that crucial details about the attack were lost and hence there was not many linkages to the incident.

On the final day, Cyber Security Agency chief David Koh suggested changing the way IT staff in the healthcare sector report incidents so that faster response can be ensured during a cyberattack, along with a review of the sector's IT processes and staff training carried out. It was also suggested that cybersecurity processes be considered as a key instead of it merely existing as an afterthought. The hearings thus concluded on 14 November 2018.

The closing submissions were held on 30 November 2018. Proposals to improve cybersecurity were shared, including the "assume breach" mindset in organisations thus taking necessary measures, having the right people and processes to complement those measures. It was also pointed out that administrator passwords are supposed to be 15 characters long, but one had a problematic password of eight characters which was unchanged since 2012. Lastly, even if measures were put in place to slow down cyberattacks, the attack was done via an advanced persistent threat (APT). Subsequently, the report was submitted to S. Iswaran on 31 December 2018 with the public version released on 10 January 2019.

== Release of report ==
On 10 January 2019, the Committee of Inquiry released a report on the SingHealth breach. The report found that staff are inadequately trained in cybersecurity, thus they are unable to stop the attacks. The key staff did not take immediate action to stop the attacks fearing pressure. To make things worse, vulnerabilities in the network and systems are not patched quickly, coupled with the fact that the attackers are well-skilled. As a result, the attackers found it easy to break in. The report did point that if the staff had been adequately trained and vulnerabilities fixed quickly, this attack could have been averted. The report also found that this is the work of an Advanced Persistent Threat group.

In the same report, the Committee of Inquiry made 16 recommendations to boost cybersecurity, separated into priority and additional recommendations. They are:

- Priority:
  - Adopting an enhanced security structure and readiness by IHiS and public health institutions
  - Review online security processes to assess ability to defend and respond to cyberattacks
  - Improving staff awareness on cyberattacks
  - Perform enhanced security checks, especially on critical information infrastructure (CII) systems
  - Subject privileged administrator accounts to tighter control and greater monitoring
  - Improve incident response processes
  - Forge partnerships between industries and the Government to achieve higher cybersecurity
- Additional:
  - IT security risk assessments and audits must be treated seriously and carried out regularly
  - Enhanced safeguards must be put in place to protect confidentiality of electronic medical records
  - Improve domain security against attacks
  - Implement a robust patch management process
  - Implement a software upgrade policy with a focus on cybersecurity
  - Implement an Internet access strategy that limits exposure to external threats
  - Clearer guidelines on when and how to respond to cybersecurity incidents
  - Improve competence of computer security incident response personnel
  - Consider a post-breach independent forensic review of the network

On 15 January 2019, S. Iswaran, Minister for Communications and Information announced in Parliament that the Government accepted the recommendations of the report and will fully adopt them. It has also sped up the implementation of the Cybersecurity Act to increase security of CIIs. Separately, Gan Kim Yong, Minister for Health announced that changes to enhance governance and operations in Singapore's healthcare institutions and IHiS will be made. The dual role of Ministry of Health's chief information security officer (MOH CISO) and the director of cybersecurity governance at IHiS will be separated, where the MOH CISO has a dedicated office and reports to the Permanent Secretary of MOH, while IHiS will have a separate director in charge of cybersecurity governance, with changes at the cluster level. This will help boost operations and governance of the IT systems. In addition, MOH will establish an enhanced "Three Lines of Defence" system for public healthcare, and pilot a "Virtual Browser" for the National University Health System. All public healthcare staff will remain on Internet Surfing Separation, which was implemented immediately after the cyberattack, and the mandatory contribution of patient medical data to the National Electronic Health Record (NEHR) system will continue to be deferred.

== Aftermath ==
Following the cyberattack, Internet access was temporarily removed from all public healthcare IT terminals with access to the healthcare network, and additional system monitoring and controls were implemented.

The attack led to a two-week pause in Singapore's Smart Nation initiatives and a review of the public sector's cyber-security policies during that time. The review resulted in implementation of additional security measures, and urged public sector administrators to remove Internet access where possible and to use secure Information Exchange Gateways otherwise. The attack also renewed concerns among some healthcare practitioners regarding ongoing efforts to centralize electronic patient data in Singapore. Plans to pass laws in late 2018 making it compulsory for healthcare providers to submit data regarding patient visits and diagnoses to the National Electronic Health Record system were postponed. In addition, the Ministry of Health announced on 6 August 2018 that the National Electrical Health Record (NEHR) will be reviewed by an independent group made up of Cyber Security Agency and PricewaterhouseCoopers before asking doctors to submit all records to the NEHR, even though it was not affected by the cyberattack.

On 24 July 2018, the Monetary Authority of Singapore told banks in Singapore to tighten customer verification processes in case leaked data was used to impersonate customers, with additional information requested. Banks are also told to conduct risk assessments and mitigate risks from misuse of information.

IHiS has since strengthened public health systems against data breaches. All suspicious IT incidents will have to be reported within 24 hours. 18 other measures are also put in place, including two-factor authentication for all administrators, proactive threat hunting and intelligence, allowing only computers with latest security updates on hospital networks, and a new database activity monitoring. Studies are done to keep Internet Separation Scheme (ISS) permanent in some parts of the healthcare system with a virtual browser being piloted as an alternative.

After the report was released, on 16 January 2019, IHiS dismissed two employees and demoted one for being negligent in handling and misunderstanding the attack respectively, with financial penalties imposed on two middle management supervisors, and five members of the senior management including CEO Bruce Liang. Three employees were commended by IHiS for handling the incident diligently even when not part of their job scope. IHiS has since fast-tracked a suite of 18 measures for enhancing cybersecurity. The next day, the Personal Data Protection Commission fined IHiS $750,000 and SingHealth $250,000 for not doing enough to safeguard personal data under the Personal Data Protection Act, making it the largest fine imposed for data breaches.

Subsequently, on 6 March 2019, cybersecurity company Symantec identified a state-sponsored group, known as Whitefly, behind the cyberattack. Although the country is not identified, that group has been found to be behind several related cyberattacks against Singapore-based entities since 2017.
