= Ronnie Tay =

Singaporean civil servant and former admiral

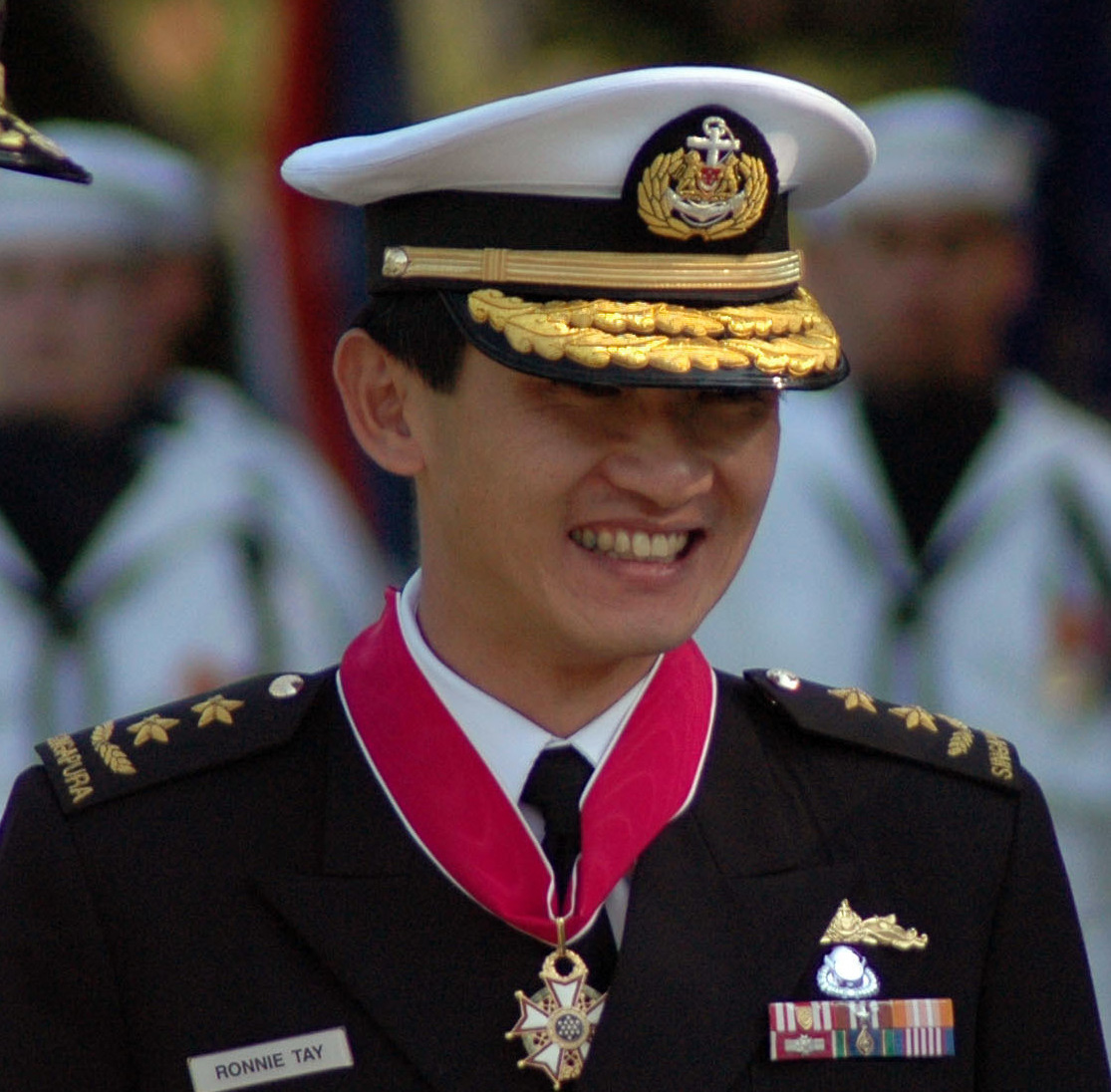
- Tay in 2007
- Born: 2 October 1963 (age 62); Singapore
- Allegiance: Singapore
- Branch: Republic of Singapore Navy
- Service years: 1981–2007
- Rank: Rear-Admiral
- Commands: Chief of Navy; Chief of Staff – Naval Staff; Head, Naval Operations Department; Fleet Commander; Commander, 1st Flotilla; Commanding Officer, 188 Squadron; Head, Naval Intelligence Department; Commanding Officer, RSS Sea Lion; Commanding Officer, RSS Swift Warlord
- Awards: See awards

Ronnie Tay
- Simplified Chinese: 戴荣利
Transcriptions
Standard Mandarin
- Hanyu Pinyin: Dài Rónglì

Ronnie Tay (born 2 October 1963) is a Singaporean civil servant and former two-star rear-admiral who served as Chief of Navy between 2003 and 2007.

After leaving the navy, Tay served as the chief executive officer of the Infocomm Development Authority of Singapore (IMDA) between 2007 and 2013, and the National Environment Agency between 2013 and 2018.

== Education ==
Tay received his secondary and pre-university education in Anglo-Chinese School (Independent) and Anglo-Chinese Junior College respectively. He was awarded the Singapore Armed Forces Overseas Scholarship in 1982 and graduated from the University of Oxford in 1985 with a Bachelor of Arts (First Class Honours) in engineering science. He attended the Singapore Command and Staff Course in 1991. He was awarded the Singapore Armed Forces Postgraduate Scholarship in 1996 and went on to obtain a Master of Science in management from the Massachusetts Institute of Technology in 1997. He also attended the Advanced Management Programme at INSEAD in France in 2007.

== Military career ==
Tay enlisted in the Singapore Armed Forces (SAF) in December 1981 and served in the Navy. Throughout his military career, he held various appointments, including: Executive Officer, RSS Sea Wolf (1987); Commanding Officer, RSS Swift Warlord (1988); Staff Officer, Naval Operations Department (1989–1990); Commanding Officer, RSS Sea Lion (1992); head, Naval Intelligence Department (1994); Commanding Officer, 188 Squadron (1997); Commander, 1st Flotilla (1998); Fleet Commander (1999); head, Naval Operations Department (2000–2001). He was promoted to the rank of one-star rear-admiral on 1 July 2001 and assumed the post of chief of staff, Naval Staff, on 20 July. Tay succeeded Lui Tuck Yew as the Chief of Navy on 1 April 2003 and was promoted to two-star rear-admiral on 1 July. He left the SAF on 31 August 2007 and relinquished his appointment to Chew Men Leong.

== Post-military career ==
After leaving the military, Tay served as the chief executive officer of the Infocomm Development Authority of Singapore from November 2007 to June 2013. He became the chief executive officer of the National Environment Agency on 1 July 2013 and continues to hold this appointment. until his retirement in October 2018.

Tay also sits on the boards or councils of various institutions, including: DSO National Laboratories; Integrated Health Information Systems; Infocomm Investments; IDA International; Media Development Authority; IT Committee, Singapore Health Services; Science and Engineering Research Council, Agency for Science, Technology and Research; National Institute of Education; Honorary Advisory Council, Singapore Computer Society; School of Information Systems, Singapore Management University.

== Awards ==
- Public Administration Medal (Military) (Gold), in 2005.
- Long Service Medal (Military), in 2007.

== Personal life ==
Tay is married and has two sons.

Military offices
| Preceded by Rear-Admiral Lui Tuck Yew | Chief of the Republic of Singapore Navy; 1 April 2003 – 31 August 2007 | Succeeded by Rear-Admiral Chew Men Leong |
