= Information exchange =

Transfer of information between entities

Information exchange or information sharing is the passing of information from one person or entity to another.

This can be done through bidirectional information transfer in telecommunications and computer science, or communication seen from a system-theoretic or information-theoretic point of view. As "information," in this context invariably refers to digital data that encodes and represents the information at hand.

Information exchange has a long history in information technology. Traditional information sharing referred to one-to-one exchanges of data between a sender and receiver. Online information sharing gives useful data to businesses for future strategies based on online sharing. These information exchanges are implemented via dozens of open and proprietary protocols, message formats, and file formats. Electronic data interchange (EDI) is a successful implementation of commercial data exchanges that began in the late 1970s and remains in use today. Initiatives to standardize information sharing protocols include the XML markup language, SOAP (simple object access protocol), and WSDL (web services description language).

In computer science, the four primary information sharing design patterns are sharing information one-to-one, one-to-many, many-to-many, and many-to-one. Technologies to meet all four of these patterns are evolving, and include blogs, wikis, really simple syndication, tagging, and chat.

One example of the United States government's attempt to implement the one-to-one pattern is the National Information Exchange Model (NIEM).

Advanced information sharing platforms provide controlled vocabularies, data harmonization, data stewardship policies and guidelines, standards for uniform data as they relate to privacy, data security, and data quality.

== Information Sharing, Intelligence Reform, and Terrorism Prevention Act ==
The term "information sharing" gained popularity as a result of the 9/11 Commission hearings and its report of the U.S. government's lack of a response to information it gathered about the September 11 attacks in 2001 prior to them. The report led to the enactment of several executive orders by U.S. president George W. Bush that mandated agencies to implement policies to "share information" across organizational boundaries. In addition, an Information Sharing Environment Program Manager (PM-ISE) was appointed, tasked to implement the provisions of the Intelligence Reform and Terrorism Prevention Act of 2004. In making recommendation toward the creation of an "Information Sharing Environment", the 9/11 Commission based itself on the findings and recommendations made by the Markle Task Force on nation security in the Information Age.

== See also ==
- Channel (communications)
- Sexual recombination enables cross-pollination in bio
- Data mapping
- Electronic data interchange
- Fusion center
- Information Exchange Gateway
- Semi-structured data
- Data interchange standards
- Health information exchange
- Cyberinfrastructure
