= PDPA =

PDPA can refer to:

- People's Democratic Party of Afghanistan, a communist party
- Personal Data Protection Act 2012, a Singapore law governing the use and protection of personal data
- Professional Darts Players Association, a trade association for darts players
