= Centre for School Design =

The Centre for School Design was launched on 24 January 2010 in London, England. It is hosted by the British Council for School Environments and has been promoted specifically to provide an open information-sharing hub around the issue of innovation in education, design and the built environment. The centre's work will be coordinated by a central website that takes and passes feeds through to a range of social media applications including Google Maps, Flickr, Twitter and other content management tools.
