= Kwek Siew Jin =

Singaporean former navy general

Kwek Siew Jin BBM PPA(E) PPA(P) PP PBM
- Born: 30 June 1950 (age 76); Colony of Singapore
- Allegiance: Singapore
- Branch: Republic of Singapore Navy
- Service years: 1969–1996
- Rank: Rear-Admiral
- Commands: Chief of Navy; Chief of Staff (Naval Staff); Fleet Commander; Head, Naval Operations Department; Head, Navy Personnel Department; Deputy Head, Naval Logistics (Material); Commanding Officer, RSS Jupiter
- Awards: See awards and decorations
- Education: University of Singapore (BE); Raffles Institution

Chinese name
- Traditional Chinese: 郭守仁
- Simplified Chinese: 郭守仁
Transcriptions
Standard Mandarin
- Hanyu Pinyin: Guō Shǒurén
- IPA: [kwó.ʂòʊ.ɻə̌n]

Kwek Siew Jin (Note: Chinese: see Chinese name and romanisations) BBM PPA(E) PPA(P) PP PBM is a Singaporean former civil servant and former rear-admiral who served as Chief of Navy from 1992 to 1996.

After leaving the navy in June 1996, Kwek was appointed as managing director of the Singapore Mass Rapid Transit till December 2001. Kwek was moved to Singapore Power to serve as its president and chief executive officer, but shortly resigned in December 2003.

== Education ==
Kwek Siew Jin attended Serangoon Garden North School for his primary education and Raffles Institution for his secondary and pre-university education. He graduated with a Cambridge School Certificate in 1967. In 1971, he was awarded a Singapore Armed Forces (SAF) local scholarship to study electrical engineering at the University of Singapore, and he graduated with a Bachelor of Engineering in 1975.

== Military career ==
In February 1969, Kwek enlisted in the SAF, and served as a naval officer in the Republic of Singapore Navy. During his career in the navy, Kwek has held the appointments of Commanding Officer, RSS Jupiter; Deputy Head, Naval Logistics (Material); Head, Navy Personnel Department; Head, Naval Operations Department; Fleet Commander; Chief of Staff (Naval Staff).

Kwek succeeded Teo Chee Hean as the Chief of Navy on 8 December 1992.

In 1993, Kwek was promoted from the rank of colonel to commodore, before being renamed as rear-admiral later in 1994. Kwek was also appointed as board director of Singapore Shipbuilding and Engineering (precursor of ST Marine). During his term as chief, Kwek initiated a training programme with Singapore Polytechnic, allowing existing navy engineers and technical officers to be quickly trained locally as marine engineers; and operationalised RSS Bedok, Singapore's first fleet of mine countermeasure vessels.

On 1 July 1995, Kwek was the first naval officer to be promoted to rear-admiral (two star), equivalent to a major-general. Kwek stepped down on 30 June 1996, with Richard Lim Cherng Yih as his successor.

== Post-military career ==
After leaving the navy, Kwek joined Singapore Mass Rapid Transit as its managing director. During his tenure, he announced major changes to the Mass Rapid Transit, such as a S$100 million plan to reduce waiting times (from 135 seconds to 90 seconds) for trains during peak hours by 2002, a S$400k plan to reduce the platform gaps at stations (from 100 mm to 75 mm) to reduce risk of injuries, and a S$310 million plan to upgrade its systems. Kwek also organised impactful activities, including raising S$152k for the National Kidney Foundation through a 2.6 km charity walk in the train tunnels from Orchard to City Hall in 1997.

During the 1997 derailment incident at Toa Payoh resulting in a train service disruption, Kwek acknowledged that human error caused the incident, and that mistakes were made by SMRT in managing the disruption. The disruption between Bishan and Newton lasted for about 8 hours, and Kwek apologised to the public for the "major disruption". As a result, in November 1997, Kwek announced that a more detailed contingency plan will be drafted out, explicitly detailing the actions that should be taken during a disruption or an emergency.

On 13 April 1999, another derailment incident occurred – this time between Yio Chu Kang and Ang Mo Kio. Disruptions lasted for almost 7 hours, and Kwek apologised three times, promising such mistakes will not happen again.

On 1 January 2002, Kwek was moved to Singapore Power (SP) and was appointed as its president and chief executive officer. On 26 December 2003, Kwek expressed his desire to "pursue other career options" and resigned from SP.

On 1 August 2006, Kwek was appointed as president of the National Council of Social Service, after serving as its vice-president since 2004. Kwek was succeeded by Hsieh Fu Hua on 1 August 2012.

== Personal life ==
Kwek is married with two children.

== Awards and decorations ==
- Public Service Star, in 2010.
- Public Administration Medal (Military) (Gold), in 1995.
- Public Administration Medal (Military) (Silver), in 1989.
- Commendation Medal (Military) (Gold), in 1981.
- Public Service Medal, in 2006.
- Singapore Armed Forces Long Service and Good Conduct (20 Years) Medal
- Singapore Armed Forces Long Service and Good Conduct (10 Years) Medal
- Singapore Armed Forces Good Service Medal
- Bintang Jalasena (1st Class), in 1995.

== Notes ==
Military offices
Preceded by Rear-Admiral Teo Chee Hean	Chief of the Republic of Singapore Navy; 8 December 1992 – 30 June 1996	Succeeded by Rear-Admiral Richard Lim Cherng Yih
