= Richard Lim Cherng Yih =

Singaporean former navy general

Richard Lim Cherng Yih PJG PPA(E) PBS
- Born: 1954 (age 71–72); Colony of Singapore
- Allegiance: Singapore
- Branch: Republic of Singapore Navy
- Service years: 1976–1999
- Rank: Rear-Admiral
- Commands: Chief of Navy; Chief of Staff (Naval Staff); Commander, Missile Gun Squadron; Head, Naval Operations Department
- Awards: See awards and decorations
- Alma mater: London Business School (MS); University of Southampton (BS)

Chinese name
- Traditional Chinese: 林承毅
- Simplified Chinese: 林承毅
Transcriptions
Standard Mandarin
- Hanyu Pinyin: Lín Chéngyì
- IPA: [lǐn.ʈʂʰə̌ŋ.î]

Richard Lim Cherng Yih (Note: Chinese: see Chinese name and romanisations) PJG PPA(E) PBS is a Singaporean civil servant and former rear-admiral who served as Chief of Navy from 1996 to 1999.

== Education ==
In 1972, Richard Lim Cherng Yih was awarded the Colombo Plan scholarship, and in 1976, he graduated from the University of Southampton with a Bachelor of Science in nautical studies.

After leaving the navy, Lim attended London Business School in September 1999, and graduated with a Master of Science in management.

== Military career ==
In 1976, Lim enlisted in the Singapore Armed Forces, and served as a naval officer in the Republic of Singapore Navy. During his career in the military, Lim has held the appointments of Head, Naval Operations Department; Commander, Missile Gun Squadron; Chief of Staff (Naval Staff).

Lim was promoted from the rank of colonel to rear-admiral on 1 July 1994. In 1995, Lim was also appointed as a board member to the Economic Development Board.

Lim succeeded Kwek Siew Jin as the Chief of Navy on 1 July 1996 and stepped down on 30 June 1999. He was succeeded by Lui Tuck Yew.

== Post-military career ==
After leaving the navy, Lim was appointed as deputy secretary of technology in the Ministry of Defence (MINDEF). On 1 December 2002, Lim succeeded Su Guaning as the chief executive of the Defence Science and Technology Agency (DSTA). During his tenure, Lim led DSTA in delivering systems to MINDEF, and supported Singapore during SARS outbreak, before stepping down on 31 December 2007.

From 2016 to 2021, Lim served on the advisory board of the engineering systems and design degree programme at Singapore University of Technology and Design.

Currently, Lim serves as the chairman of the Energy Market Authority and Synapxe. Lim is also an adjunct professor in industrial systems engineering and management at Nanyang Technological University and National University of Singapore.

== Awards and decorations ==
- Meritorious Service Medal, in 2024.
- Public Administration Medal (Military) (Gold), in 1997.
- Long Service Medal, in 2002.
- Singapore Armed Forces Long Service and Good Conduct (20 Years) Medal
- Singapore Armed Forces Long Service and Good Conduct (10 Years) Medal
- Singapore Armed Forces Good Service Medal

== Notes ==
Military offices
Preceded by Rear-Admiral Kwek Siew Jin	Chief of the Republic of Singapore Navy; 1 July 1996 – 30 June 1999	Succeeded by Rear-Admiral Lui Tuck Yew
