= Lai Chung Han =

Singaporean former admiral

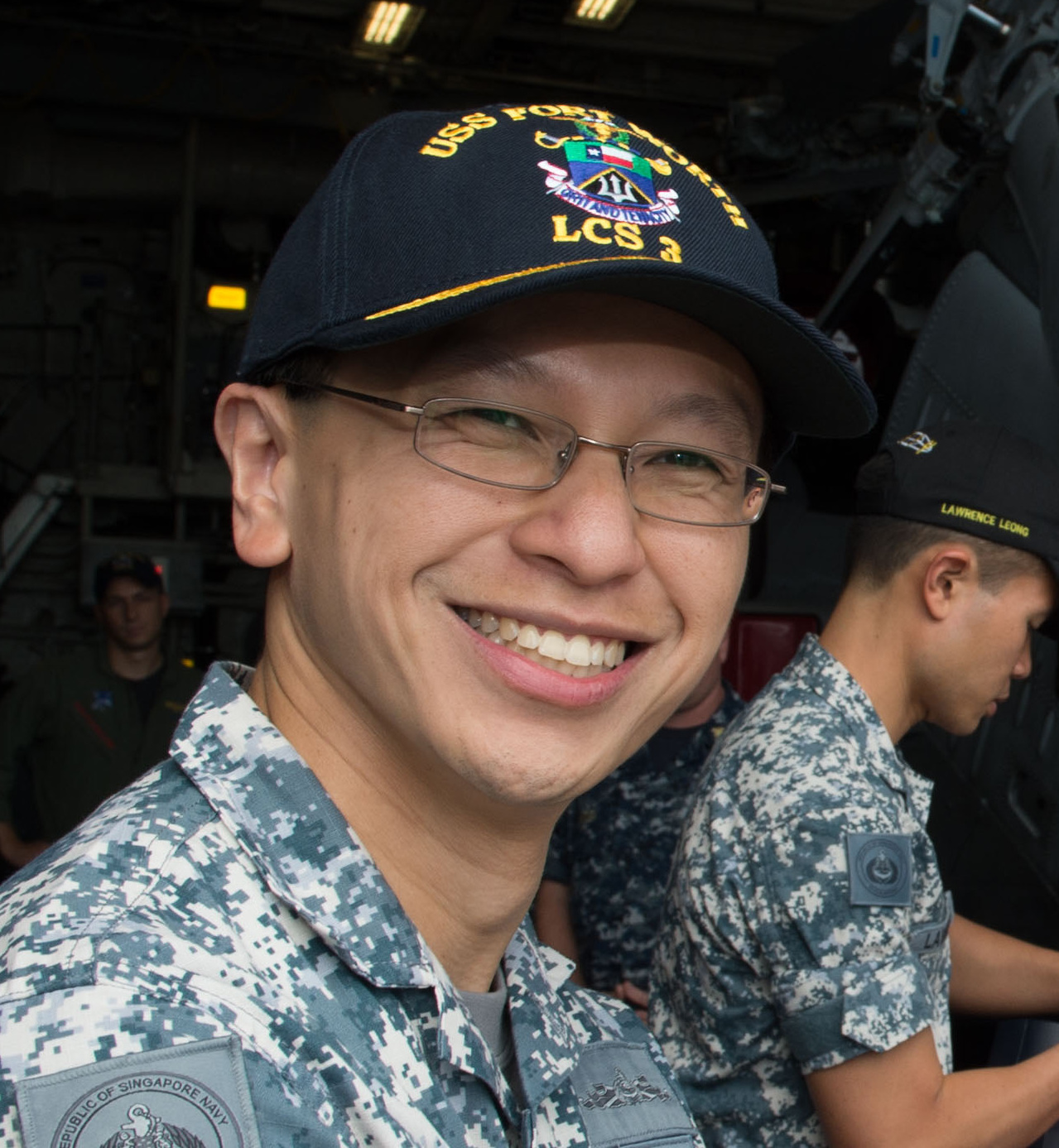
- Lai in 2015
- Born: 1973 (age 52–53); Singapore
- Allegiance: Singapore
- Branch: Republic of Singapore Navy
- Service years: 1992–2017
- Rank: Rear-Admiral
- Commands: Chief of Navy; Deputy Secretary (Policy), Ministry of Defence; Director (Policy), Ministry of Defence; Office Director, Future Systems Directorate; Head of Long Term Planning Secretariat, Office of the Chief of Defence Force; Fleet Commander; Commander, Missile Corvette Squadron; Commanding Officer, RSS Valiant
- Awards: See awards
- Alma mater: Christ's College, Cambridge (BA); Harvard University (MPA)
- Spouse: Ng Chiew Yen
- Children: 2

Lai Chung Han
- Simplified Chinese: 黎忠汉
Transcriptions
Standard Mandarin
- Hanyu Pinyin: Lí Zhōnghàn

Lai Chung Han PPA(P) is a Singaporean civil servant and former two-star rear-admiral who served as Chief of Navy between 2014 and 2017.

== Education ==
Lai was awarded the President's Scholarship and Singapore Armed Forces Overseas Scholarship in 1992. He graduated from Christ's College, Cambridge with a Bachelor of Arts with first class honours degree in economics.

He received the Singapore Armed Forces Overseas Postgraduate Scholarship (General Development) in 2006, before going on to complete a Master of Public Administration degree at Harvard University. He also attended the Naval War College in the United States.

== Military career ==
Lai enlisted in the Singapore Armed Forces (SAF) in 1992 and served in the Republic of Singapore Navy (RSN). He served on board the RSS Valour as a junior officer and later as Executive Officer before assuming command of the RSS Valiant from 2002 to 2004. He was appointed as Commander of the Missile Corvette Squadron in July 2007 and later Fleet Commander in April 2011.

Lai has also held a number of staff appointments concurrently in the headquarters of the Ministry of Defence (MINDEF), this include: Head of Long Term Planning Secretariat, Office of the Chief of Defence Force; Office Director, Future Systems Directorate; Director (Policy), Ministry of Defence (2007–2010); Deputy Secretary (Policy), Ministry of Defence (2012–2014).

Lai was promoted to the rank two-star rear-admiral on 1 July 2014. He succeeded Ng Chee Peng as Chief of Navy on 1 August 2014.

Lai stepped down as Chief of Navy with Rear-Admiral Lew Chuen Hong, previously Chief of Staff – Naval Staff, taking over the command on Change of Command Parade held at RSS Singapura – Changi Naval Base on 16 June 2017.

== Civil Service career ==
Lai was formerly a member of the board of ST Marine and ST Electronics (Info-Comm Systems) and a member of the Board of Governors of Temasek Polytechnic.

Lai was appointed Second Permanent Secretary for Education on 19 June 2017, and Second Permanent Secretary for Home Affairs on 1 September 2017, concurrently. On 1 April 2019, Lai relinquished both appointments before being appointed Permanent Secretary for Education. On 1 July 2024, Lai relinquished his appointment and was appointed Permanent Secretary (Development) in the Ministry of Finance. On 1 May 2025, Lai was appointed Permanent Secretary (Finance), making him the top civil servant at the Ministry of Finance.

== Personal life ==
Lai is married to Ng Chiew Yen and they have two children.

== Awards and decorations ==
- Public Administration Medal (Military) (Silver), 2010.
- Public Administration Medal (Military) (Gold), 2016.
- Long Service Award (Military), 2017.
- Public Administration Medal (Gold), 2022.

Military offices
Preceded by Rear-Admiral Ng Chee Peng	Chief of the Republic of Singapore Navy; 1 August 2014 – 16 June 2017	Succeeded by Rear-Admiral Lew Chuen Hong
