= Ng Chee Khern =

Singaporean civil servant and major-general

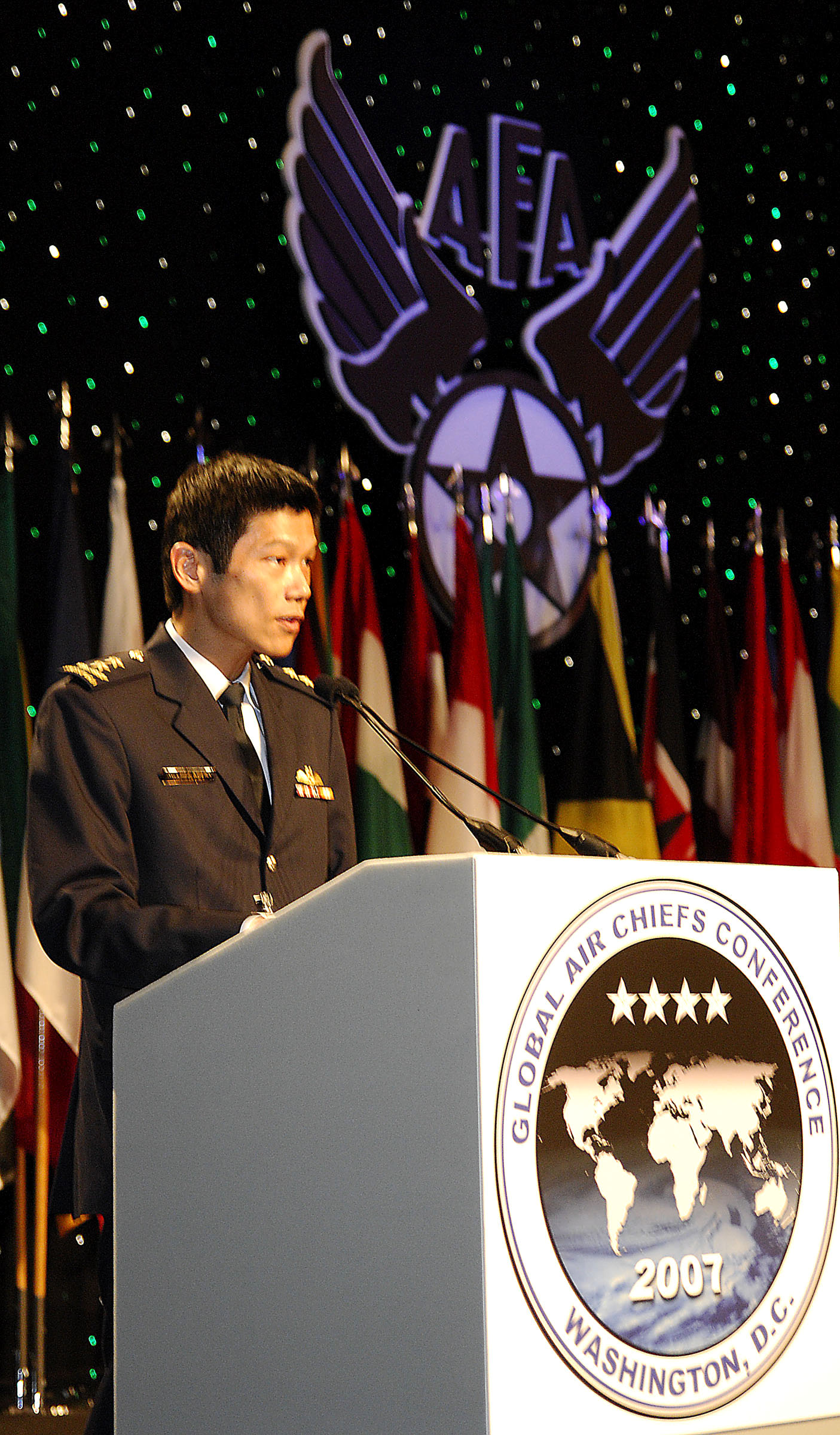
- Ng in 2007
- Born: 18 October 1965 (age 60); Singapore
- Allegiance: Singapore
- Branch: Republic of Singapore Air Force
- Service years: 1984–2009
- Rank: Major-General
- Commands: Chief of Air Force; Chief of Staff – Air Staff; Director, Joint Operations and Planning Directorate; Commander, Tengah Air Base; Commanding Officer, 149 Squadron
- Awards: See awards
- Spouse: Elaine Ng
- Other work: Permanent Secretary (Manpower) – from April 2022 to December 2025 Permanent Secretary, Smart Nation and Digital Government – from May 2017 to March 2022

Ng Chee Khern
- Simplified Chinese: 黄志勤
- Hokkien POJ: N̂g Chì-khîn
Transcriptions
Standard Mandarin
- Hanyu Pinyin: Huáng Zhìqín
Southern Min
- Hokkien POJ: N̂g Chì-khîn

Ng Chee Khern PPA(E) LOM (born 18 October 1965) is a Singaporean civil servant and former major-general who served as Chief of Air Force between 2006 and 2009. He previously served as Permanent Secretary (Smart Nation and Digital Government) under the Prime Minister's Office, and Chairman of the Government Technology Agency. He was appointed Permanent Secretary (Manpower) in April 2022. He retired from the public service on 1 December 2025 after more than 40 years in public service.

== Education ==
Ng is an alumnus of Victoria School and Hwa Chong Junior College, and was a recipient of the President's Scholarship and Singapore Armed Forces Overseas Scholarship in 1985.

He graduated from the University of Oxford with a Bachelor of Arts with second upper class honours degree and a Master of Arts degree in philosophy, politics and economics (PPE). He also completed a Master of Public Administration degree at Harvard University.

== Military career ==
Ng enlisted in the Singapore Armed Forces (SAF) in 1984 and served in the Republic of Singapore Air Force (RSAF). He flew the Northrop F-5E Tiger-II and the F-16 Fighting Falcon.

Throughout his military career, Ng held various appointments, including: Commanding Officer, 149 Squadron; Commander, Tengah Air Base; Director, Joint Operations and Planning Directorate; Chief of Staff (Air Staff). He succeeded Lim Kim Choon as the Chief of Air Force on 24 March 2006 and relinquished this appointment to his second brother, Ng Chee Meng, on 10 December 2009.

== Civil Service career ==
After leaving the Air Force, Ng was appointed Director of the Security and Intelligence Division on 1 September 2010. He left the post on 1 May 2014, and served as Permanent Secretary (Defence Development) at the Ministry of Defence. He was also appointed Second Permanent Secretary at the Ministry of Health on 1 August 2014.

Ng is also a member of the boards of various governmental organisations, including: Public Utilities Board (PUB); CapitaMall Trust Management; Chartered Ammunition Industries; ST Aerospace Systems; Changi International Airshow & Events; MDSO Supervisory Board; Construction Industry Development Board; Defence Science and Technology Agency; DSO National Laboratories; Civil Aviation Authority of Singapore.

== Personal life ==
Ng has two younger brothers. Ng Chee Meng, a politician and former lieutenant-general who served as Chief of Air Force between 2009 and 2013, Chief of Defence Force between 2013 and 2015, and Member of Parliament (MP) for Pasir Ris–Punggol GRC between 2015 and 2020. Ng Chee Peng, a former two-star rear-admiral who served as Chief of Navy between 2011 and 2014. Ng and his brothers are Chinese Singaporean of Teochew descent.

== Awards ==
=== National honours ===
- Singapore
  - Public Administration Medal (Gold), in 2016.
  - Public Administration Medal (Gold) (Military), in 2005.
  - Long Service Medal (Military), in 2009.

=== Foreign honours ===
- United States
  - United States Legion of Merit (Commander Degree)
- Indonesia
  - Bintang Swa Bhuwana Paksa Utama (1st Class)
- Thailand
  - Order of the Crown of Thailand (1st Class)
- France
  - Legion of Honour (Commander)

Military offices
Preceded by Major-General Lim Kim Choon	Chief of the Republic of Singapore Air Force; 24 March 2006 – 10 December 2009	Succeeded by Brigadier-General Ng Chee Meng
