= Civil Aviation Authority of Singapore =

Agency overview
- Formed: 1 September 1984; 41 years ago
- Superseding agency: Changi Airport Group (corporatised)
- Jurisdiction: Government of Singapore
- Headquarters: 60 Airport Boulevard, Changi Airport Terminal 2, Singapore 819643
- Agency executives: Edmund Cheng, Chairman; Han Kok Juan, Director-General
- Parent agency: Ministry of Transport
- Child agency: Singapore Aviation Academy
- Website: www.caas.gov.sg
- Agency ID: T08GB0008A

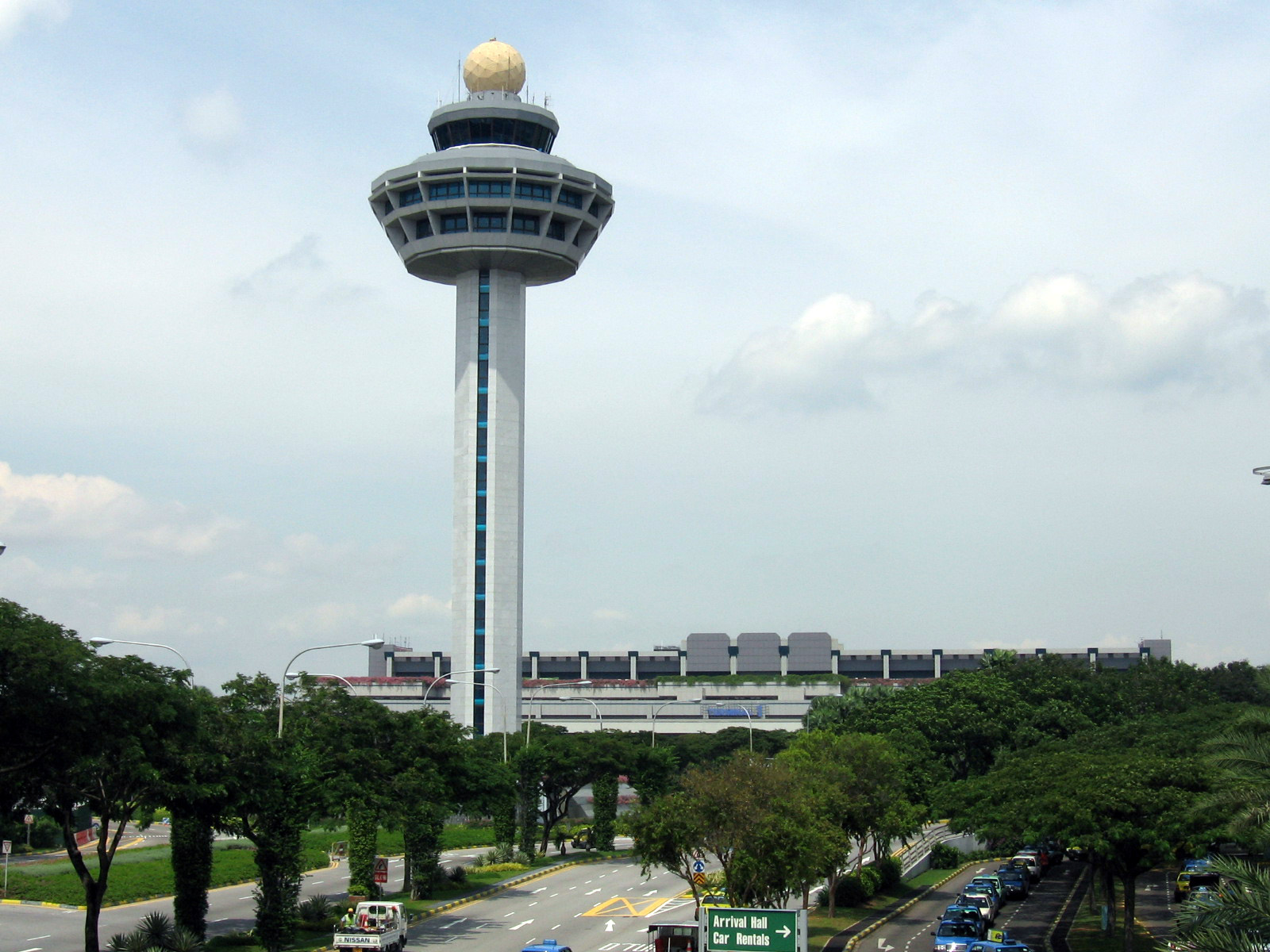
The control tower of Changi Airport.

The Civil Aviation Authority of Singapore (CAAS) is Singapore's civil aviation authority and a statutory board under the Ministry of Transport of the Government of Singapore. Its head office is located on the fourth storey of Singapore Changi Airport's Terminal 2.

== History ==
Established on 1 September 1984, the CAAS regulates civilian air traffic within the airspace jurisdiction of the Republic. It also helps enable the growth of the air hub and aviation industry in Singapore, promotes safe industry practices and engages in civilian air-service agreements with air-service operators. This includes the usage of unmanned aerial vehicles (UAVs) such as drones and quadcopters by individuals or organisations. The agency also operates the Air Traffic Control Tower, providing air navigation services to ensure faultless movements of civilian aircraft at Singapore's airports and in the Singapore flight information region (FIR).

CAAS supports and controls the Singapore Aviation Academy (est. 1958).

CAAS also issues revenue stamps to pay for the passenger service charge on flights.

In 2009, CAAS updated its logo, positioning, and values with brand consultancy DIA.

In 2015, Shum Jin-Chyi Kevin assumed the position of Director-General (DG) of CAAS.

In July 2017, CAAS and the European Union Aviation Safety Agency (EASA) entered into a working arrangement to recognize each other's certifications.

In 2018, CAAS underwent a brand refresh with Tangible, a Singapore-based brand consultancy.

On 2 August 2021, Han Kok Juan, the returning officer for Elections Department Singapore, assumed the role of DG of CAAS.

== Membership ==
=== Chairmen ===
Name	Years served	Notes
Sim Kee Boon	1984–1999	
Tjong Yik Min	1999–2005	
Liew Mun Leong	2005–2009	
Lee Hsien Yang	2009–2018	
Edmund Cheng	2018–2026	
Ng Chee Khern	2026–present	

=== Director generals ===
Name	Years served	Notes
Lim Hock San	1984–1992	
Wong Woon Liong	1992–2007	
Lim Kim Choon	2007–2009	
Yap Ong Heng	2009–2015	
Kevin Shum Jin-Chyi	2015–2021	
Han Kok Juan	2021–present	

== See also ==
- Aviation safety
- Singapore Changi Airport
- Jarnail Singh
