= Chew Men Leong =

Singaporean former naval admiral

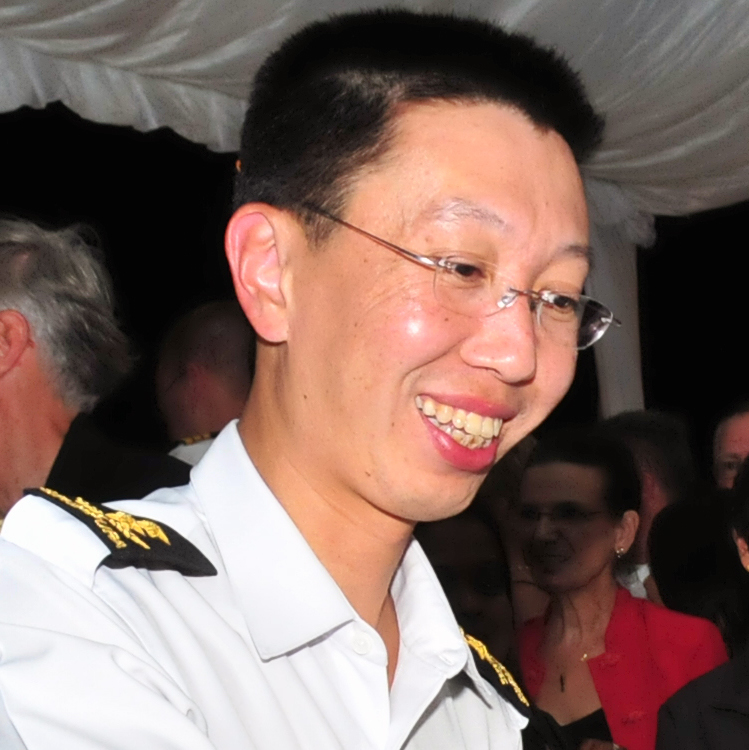
- Chew in 2009
- Born: 1967 (age 58–59); Singapore
- Military career
- Allegiance: Singapore
- Branch: Republic of Singapore Navy
- Service years: 1985–2011
- Rank: Rear-Admiral
- Commands: Chief of Navy; Chief of Staff – Naval Staff; Head, Naval Operations Department; Fleet Commander; Head, Joint Plans and Transformation Department; Commander, 1st Flotilla; Commanding Officer, 188 Squadron; Commanding Officer, RSS Vigour
- Awards: See awards

Chew Men Leong
- Simplified Chinese: 赵文良
Transcriptions
Standard Mandarin
- Hanyu Pinyin: Zhào Wénliáng

Chew Men Leong is a Singaporean former two-star rear-admiral who served as Chief of Navy between 2007 and 2011.

== Education ==
Chew received his pre-university education in Raffles Junior College and graduated in 1985. He was awarded the Singapore Armed Forces Overseas Scholarship in 1987. He graduated with a bachelor's degree (first class honours) in electrical and electronic engineering from Imperial College London in 1990. He was awarded the Singapore Armed Forces Postgraduate Scholarship in 2001 and went on to obtain a Master of Science in management from Stanford University in 2002.

== Military career ==
Chew enlisted in the Singapore Armed Forces (SAF) in 1985. Throughout his military career, he held various appointments, including: Executive Officer, RSS Sea Lion (1992–1994); Commanding Officer, RSS Vigour (1998–2000); Commanding Officer, 188 Squadron (2000); Commander, 1st Flotilla (2001); Head, Joint Plans and Transformation Department (2002–2004); Fleet Commander (2004–2005); Head, Naval Operations Department (2006); Chief of Staff, Naval Staff (2006–2007).

Chew succeeded Ronnie Tay as the Chief of Navy on 31 August 2007. He left the SAF on 29 March 2011 and relinquished his appointment to Ng Chee Peng.

== Post-military career ==
After retiring from the military, Chew became the chief executive officer of the Public Utilities Board (PUB), Singapore's national water agency on 8 December 2011 to 30 September 2014. Subsequently, he was appointed as Chief Executive of the Land Transport Authority from 1 October 2014 to 11 November 2016 until his resignation from the public service. He also sits on the board of Jurong Port Pte Ltd and is also a member of the Singapore Quality Award Governing Council.

== Awards ==
- Public Administration Medal (Military) (Gold), in 2008.
- Officer, Legion of Honour, in 2011.

Military offices
Preceded by Rear-Admiral Ronnie Tay	Chief of the Republic of Singapore Navy; 31 Aug 2007 - 29 March 2011	Succeeded by Rear-Admiral Ng Chee Peng
