= Ng Chee Peng =

Singaporean former naval admiral

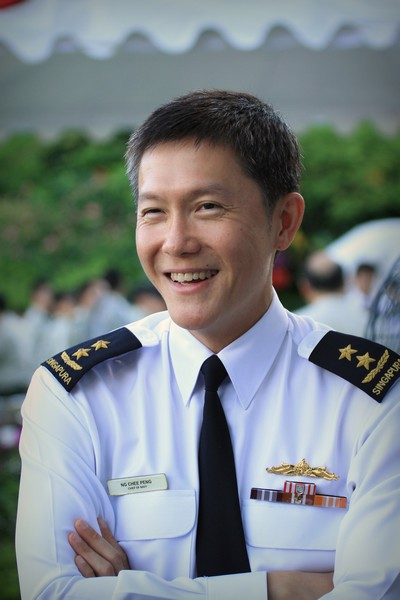
- Ng in 2012
- Born: 1970 (age 55–56); Singapore
- Allegiance: Singapore
- Branch: Republic of Singapore Navy
- Service years: 1988–2014
- Rank: Rear-Admiral
- Commands: Chief of Navy; Chief of Staff – Joint Staff; Chief of Staff – Naval Staff; Fleet Commander; Director (Policy), Ministry of Defence; Commander, 1st Flotilla; Head, Long Term Planning Secretariat, Office of the Chief of Defence Force; Head, Operations Planning Branch, Naval Operations Department; Commanding Officer, Missile Corvette Squadron; Commanding Officer, RSS Victory
- Awards: See awards
- Education: University of Oxford (BA); Harvard University (MPA)
- Spouse: Valerie Low

Ng Chee Peng
- Simplified Chinese: 黄志平
Transcriptions
Standard Mandarin
- Hanyu Pinyin: Huáng Zhìpíng

Ng Chee Peng PPA(P) LOM is a Singaporean civil servant and former two-star rear-admiral who served as Chief of Navy between 2011 and 2014.

== Education ==
Ng was awarded the President's Scholarship and Singapore Armed Forces Overseas Scholarship in 1989. He graduated from the University of Oxford with a Bachelor of Arts with first class honours degree in philosophy, politics and economics (PPE).

He was awarded the Singapore Armed Forces Postgraduate Scholarship (General Development) in 2002, before going on to complete a Master of Public Administration degree at Harvard University.

== Career ==
=== Military career ===
Ng enlisted in the Singapore Armed Forces (SAF) in December 1988 and served in the Navy. He spent his early days with the Missile Gun Boats, first as a junior officer and later as the Executive Officer on board the RSS Sea Tiger. He was also the Anti-Submarine Warfare Officer on board the RSS Valiant. He assumed his first command on board the Missile Corvette RSS Victory. He also held various staff appointments in the headquarters of the Ministry of Defence (MINDEF), including: Head, Operations Planning Branch, Naval Operations Department; Head, Long Term Planning Secretariat, Office of the Chief of Defence Force.

After returning from his studies in Harvard University in 2002, Ng was appointed as the Commanding Officer of the Missile Corvette Squadron in July 2003, and concurrently served as the Commander of the First Flotilla from January 2004. He held the following appointments later: Director (Policy), MINDEF (2005–2007); Fleet Commander (2007–2009); Chief of Staff, Naval Staff (2009–2010); Chief of Staff, Joint Staff (2010–2011). Ng succeeded Chew Men Leong as the Chief of Navy on 29 March 2011 and was promoted to the rank of two-star rear-admiral on 1 July.

Ng stepped down from his position as the Chief of Navy on 1 August 2014 and was succeeded by Lai Chung Han.

=== Public career ===
Ng was appointed as the chief executive officer of the Central Provident Fund Board on 15 March 2015. Prior to that, he served as Deputy Secretary (Special Projects) at the Ministry of Manpower. Ng stepped down as the chief executive officer of the CPF Board on 1 April 2019.

Ng remained a senior advisor at the MOM and CPF Board, as well as on the board committee for transformation at Public Utilities Board, as of March 2021. He was appointed as a non-executive and independent director of Great Eastern Holdings.

== Personal life ==
Ng has two elder brothers. Ng Chee Khern, a former major-general who served as Chief of Air Force between 2006 and 2009. Ng Chee Meng, a politician and lieutenant-general who served as Chief of Air Force between 2009 and 2013, Chief of Defence Force between 2013 and 2015, and Member of Parliament (MP) for Pasir Ris–Punggol GRC between 2015 and 2020. Ng and his brothers are Chinese Singaporean of Teochew descent.

Ng is married to Valerie Low.

== Awards ==
- Public Administration Medal (Silver) (Military), in 2007.
- Legion of Merit, in 2012.
- Navy Meritorius Service Star (1 Class), in 2013

Military offices
Preceded by Rear-Admiral Chew Men Leong	Chief of the Republic of Singapore Navy; 29 March 2011 – 1 August 2014	Succeeded by Rear-Admiral Lai Chung Han
