= Jarnail Singh (physician) =

Aviation medicine practitioner (died 2021)

- Born: 1953 or 1954; India
- Died: 6 February 2021 (aged 67); Singapore
- Occupation: Aviation medicine practitioner
- Known for: Studies of communicable diseases spread via air travel; fatigue and impact on aviation operators
- Awards: Pingat Pentadbiran Awam, Perak (2015)

Jarnail Singh (1953/1954 – 6 February 2021) was a Singaporean physician who focused on aviation medicine. He was known for coordinating the aviation community's response to the severe acute respiratory syndrome (SARS) epidemic outbreak in 2003 and had led the International Civil Aviation Organization's anti-SARS projects for impacted states, studying the spread of communicable diseases via air travel. He also led health studies on pilot fatigue on ultra long-haul flights. He was the chairman of the Civil Aviation Authority of Singapore's Medical Board and the first Asian president of the International Academy of Aviation and Space Medicine.

He was a recipient of the Singapore government's Pingat Pentadbiran Awam, Perak award in 2015 for public services.

== Education ==
Singh attended medicine school at the Government Medical College at the Panjab University in Patiala in India, as a recipient of a Government of India scholarship. He returned back to Singapore and completed his national service as a physician at the Tengah and Sembawang air force bases. He served the Singapore Armed Forces Medical Corps and later with the Republic of Singapore Air Force where he specialized in aviation medicine. He received a diploma in aviation medicine from the RAF Institute of Aviation Medicine in Farnborough in England in 1983. He later went on to graduate with a Master of Science degree in occupational medicine from the National University of Singapore and also held a diploma in aviation medicine from the Faculty of Occupational Medicine at the Royal College of Physicians in London.

== Career ==
Singh started his career at the RSAF Aeromedical center, and went on to serve as the head of Aviation Physiology Training. He set up the High-G training program for RSAF pilots based on a similar program that he had attended at the United States Air Force School of Aerospace Medicine. He was seconded to the Civil Aviation Authority of Singapore (CAAS) in 1993 and went on to become the first chairman of its Civil Aviation Medical Board. He had coordinated the international response to severe acute respiratory syndrome in 2003 and his actions had helped the aviation sector to recover post the outbreak. His studies focused on the understanding the spread of communicable diseases via air travel. During this period, he led the International Civil Aviation Organization (ICAO)'s Anti-SARS project for affected states. He also led the organization's committee to study the spread of communicable diseases through air travel.

As a member of the CAAS task force on ultra-long-range flights, Singh had led health studies before launching the world's first ultra long-haul flight between Singapore and New York in 2004. Specifically, his work focused on studying the alertness of flightcrew on ultra long-haul flights. Some of his work with International Civil Aviation Organization was as a regulatory pioneer studying and managing human fatigue linked operational risks. Some of his studies would lead the organization to develop new standards and practices to address pilot and operator fatigue, including the Fatigue Risk Management System (FRMS).

Singh also led the human factors working group as a part of the investigations of the Singapore Airlines Flight 006 crash in October 2000 that had killed 81 of the 179 occupants.

Singh was a pioneer in establishing aviation medicine as a speciality in Singapore, focusing on training younger physicians and examiners to lead health examinations and assessments of pilots, air crew, and air traffic controllers. He also led the development and setup of Singapore Air Force's aeromedical center.

Singh was member of many other global and local aviation medicine organizations including serving as a technical advisor to the ICAO and World Health Organization's Ebola activation plan project. He was a recipient of the Singapore government's Pingat Pentadbiran Awam, Perak, or the Public Administration Medal (Silver), in 2015 for his services. He was the first Asian president of the International Academy of Aviation and Space Medicine.

== Personal life ==
Singh was married and had two children; a son and a daughter. He died on 6 February 2021, in Singapore. He was 67.

== Published works ==
- Gan, Wee Hoe, Rayden Low, and Jarnail Singh. "Aviation Medicine: global historical perspectives and the development of Aviation Medicine alongside the growth of Singapore's aviation landscape." Singapore Medical Journal 52.5 (2011): 324.
- Srinivasan, Venkatramanujam; Singh, Jarnail; Pandi-Perumal, Seithikurippu R.; Brown, Gregory M.; Spence, David Warren; Cardinali, Daniel P. (2010). "Jet lag, circadian rhythm sleep disturbances, and depression: the role of melatonin and its analogs". Advances in Therapy. 27 (11): 796–813. doi:10.1007/s12325-010-0065-y. ISSN 1865-8652. PMID 20827520. S2CID 13282629.
- Evans, Anthony D; Watson, Dougal B; Evans, Sally A; Hastings, John; Singh, Jarnail; Thibeault, Claude (2009). "Safety Management as a Foundation for Evidence-Based Aeromedical Standards and Reporting of Medical Events". Aviation, Space, and Environmental Medicine. 80 (6): 511–515. doi:10.3357/ASEM.2465.2009. PMID 19522360.
- Evans, Anthony; Finkelstein, Silvio; Singh, Jarnail; Thibeault, Claude (2006). "Pandemic Influenza: A Note on International Planning to Reduce the Risk from Air Transport". Aviation, Space, and Environmental Medicine. 77 (9): 974–976. PMID 16964750.
- Kaur, Charanjit; Singh, Jarnail (2005). "Fos Expression in the Suprachiasmatic Nucleus in Rats Following High Altitude Exposure". Aviation, Space, and Environmental Medicine. 76 (2): 117–120. PMID 15742827.

== See also ==
- Singapore Airlines Flights 21 and 22
