= Personal Data Protection Act 2012 =

Statute of the Parliament of Singapore

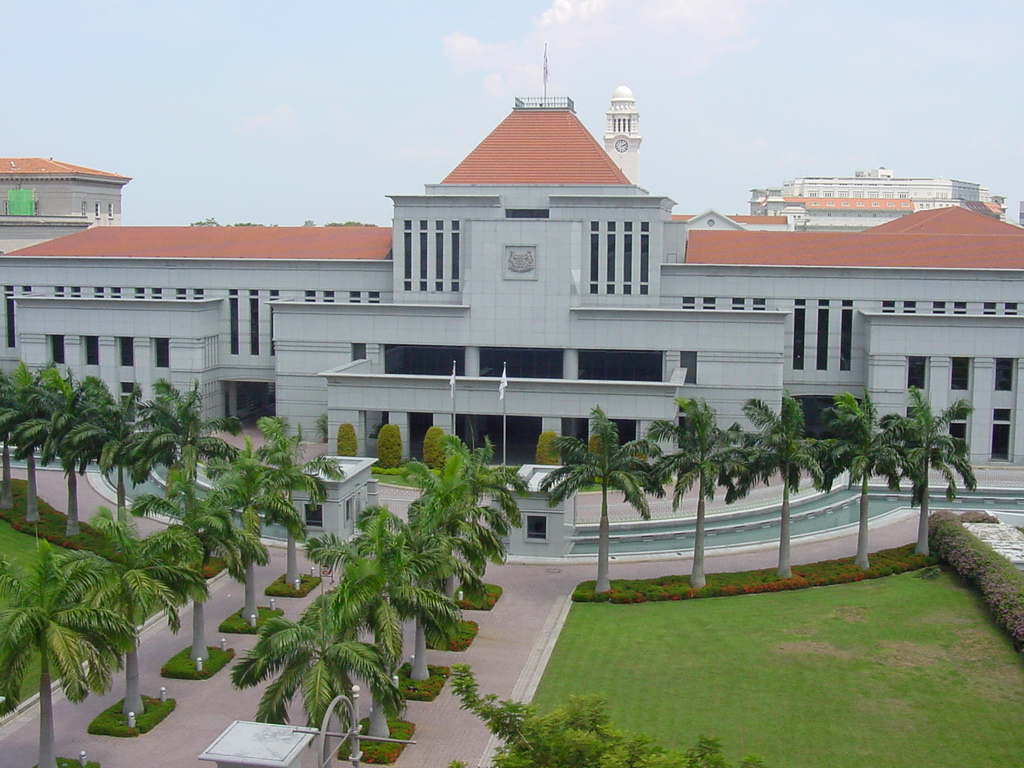
- Parliament House, Singapore

Parliament of Singapore
- Long title: An Act to govern the collection, use and disclosure of personal data by organisations, and to establish the Do Not Call Register and to provide for its administration, and for matters connected therewith, and to make related and consequential amendments to various other Acts.
- Citation: No. 26 of 2012
- Passed by: Parliament of Singapore
- Passed: 15 October 2012
- Assented to: 20 November 2012

Legislative history
- Bill title: Personal Data Protection Bill
- Introduced by: Assoc Prof Dr Yaacob Ibrahim
- Status: In force

The Personal Data Protection Act 2012 ("PDPA") sets out the law on data protection in Singapore. The PDPA regulates the processing of personal data in the private sector.

== Overview ==
The PDPA establishes a general data protection regime, originally comprising nine data protection obligations which are imposed on organisations: the Consent Obligation, the Purpose Limitation Obligation, the Notification Obligation, the Access and Correction Obligation, the Accuracy Obligation, the Protection Obligation, the Retention Limitation Obligation, the Transfer Limitation Obligation and the Openness Obligation (now referred to as the Accountability Obligation).

Major amendments to the PDPA were proposed and passed in 2020. Among other changes, a tenth data protection obligation was added, namely, the Data Breach Notification Obligation.

The PDPA also governs telemarketing in Singapore. It establishes the Do Not Call Registers, on which telephone numbers may be registered. There are three Do Not Call Registers: (i) the No Fax Message Register; (ii) the No Text Message Register; and (iii) the No Voice Call Register. Generally, if a telephone number is listed on a Do Not Call Register (e.g. the No Text Message Register), then it is not permitted to send a marketing message of the relevant kind to that telephone number. Businesses typically use compliance checklists to ensure these registers are screened before telemarketing campaigns.

== Personal Data Protection Commission ==
The PDPA establishes the Personal Data Protection Commission (PDPC) as the regulatory authority governing data protection in Singapore. The PDPC enforces the PDPA and publishes advisory guidelines on the interpretation of the PDPA. To date, the PDPC has enforced the PDPA against a number of organisations. Notable enforcement cases include SingHealth, which was implicated in the 2018 SingHealth data breach.

In July 2026, the PDPC issued advisory guidelines requiring organizations that seek consent to use personal data for training or fine-tuning generative artificial intelligence models to provide AI-specific notifications. The notifications are intended to explain the purpose of the data use, the types of personal data involved and how the data will be used. The requirement does not apply when organisations use anonymised data.

=== Management ===
Commissioner
| Date | Commissioner | Remarks |
|---|---|---|
| 1 January 2017 - 20 June 2020 | Tan Kiat How | |
| 20 June 2020 - 1 April 2026 | Lew Chuen Hong | |
| 1 April 2026 - Present | Denise Wong | |
