= Message format =

In telecommunications, a message format is a predetermined or prescribed spatial or time-sequential arrangement of the parts of a message that is recorded in or on a data storage medium.

At one time, messages prepared for electrical transmission were composed on a printed blank form with spaces for each part of the message and for administrative entries.

This article incorporates public domain material from Federal Standard 1037C. General Services Administration. Archived from the original on 2022-01-22.
