= Masaru Yanagisawa =

Masaru Yanagisawa (柳沢勝; died 2007) was the Honorary Tourism Consul of the Singapore Tourism Board (STB), and the Chairman of the Hakodate Singapore Society. He played an important part in establishing the links between the Hakodate International Tourism and Convention Association (HITCA) and the STB, which facilitates tourism and business exchanges between the two cities.

He founded the Hakodate Singapore Society, which promotes Singapore to the people of Hokkaido. The Society organised the annual Singapore Food Festivals in Hakodate (sponsoring the Hakodate Seafood Night in July 1998) and led visits to Singapore. For eight consecutive years he hosted STB's Annual Tourism Awards winners in his Hotel Hakodate Royal.

He brought Singaporean elements to Hakodate, including merlions erected in the city park and his spa resort in Hakodate, the Singapore Trishaw in his hotel lobby, his souvenir shop named Sentosa Shop, his bar serving the Singapore Sling and a beer called the Merlion.

In the 19th STB Tourism Awards he was accorded the Special Recognition Award, and was re-appointed as STB's Honorary Tourism Consul on 19 November 2007.

He died on 21 November 2007 in Japan.

== Sources ==
- The Straits Times article on Hokkaido
- Singapore Tourism Board Media Release: Goodwill Mission from Hakodate
- Singapore Tourism Board Media Release: 19th Tourism Awards
- Singapore Tourism Board Tourism Awards Winners 2004
- EHotelier News
