= Lew Chuen Hong =

Singaporean naval officer

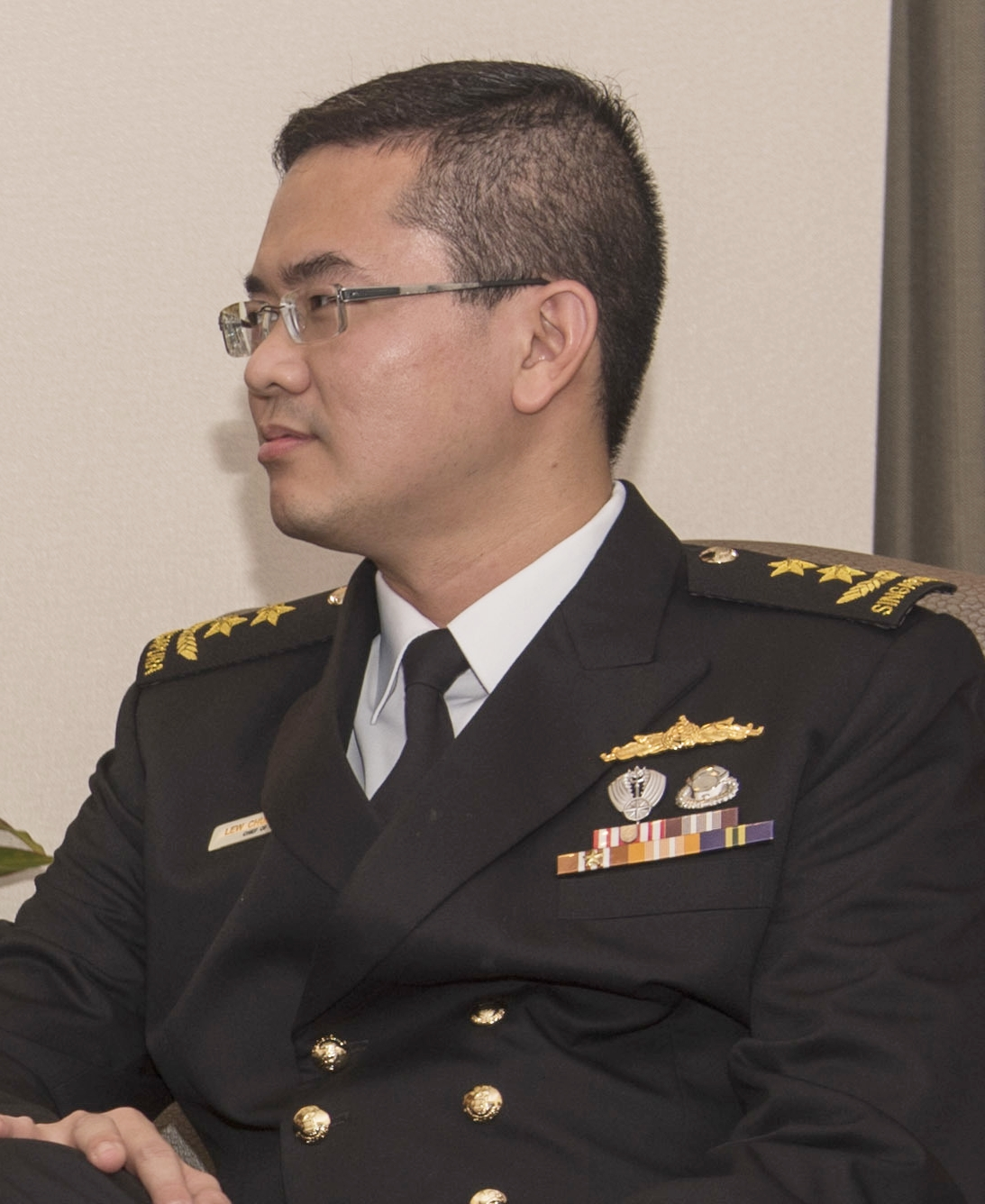
- Lew in 2018
- Born: 1976 (age 49–50); Singapore
- Military career
- Allegiance: Singapore
- Branch: Republic of Singapore Navy
- Service years: 1995–2020
- Rank: Rear-Admiral
- Commands: Chief of Navy; Chief of Staff – Naval Staff; Fleet Commander; Head, Joint Plans and Transformation Department; Deputy Commander, Maritime Security Task Force; Commanding Officer, RSS Vengeance

Lew Chuen Hong (Chinese: 刘全康) is a Singaporean former two-star rear-admiral who served as Chief of Navy between 2017 and 2020.

He was the chief executive officer of Infocomm Media Development Authority (IMDA) and the commissioner for Personal Data Protection Commission (PDPC) between 2020 and 2025.

Lew later joined venture capital firm Granite Asia as a partner.

Military offices
Preceded by Lai Chung Han	Chief of Navy of the Republic of Singapore Navy; 2017–2020	Succeeded by Aaron Beng
