= Chief of Navy (Singapore) =

Chief of Singapore Navy

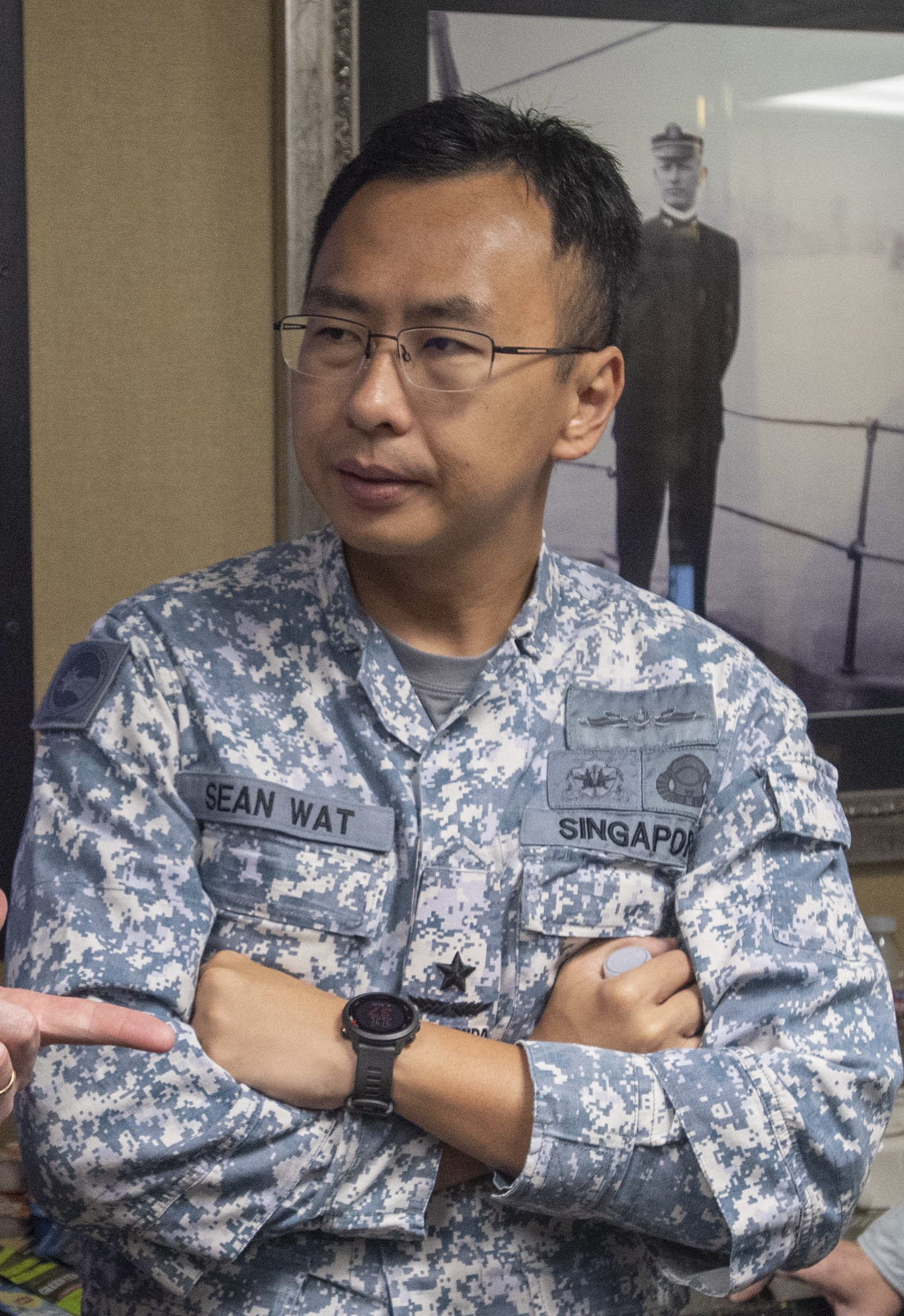
- Incumbent; Rear-Admiral Sean Wat since 10 March 2023
- Republic of Singapore Navy
- Type: Commanding general
- Abbreviation: CNV
- Reports to: Chief of Defence Force
- Nominator: Prime Minister of Singapore
- Appointer: President of Singapore
- Term length: No term limit
- Formation: 1966; 60 years ago
- First holder: Jaswant Singh Gill

The Chief of Navy is the head of the Republic of Singapore Navy (RSN), who holds the rank of Rear-Admiral. The current Chief of Navy is Sean Wat, who was appointed on 10 March 2023.

== List of chiefs of Navy ==
No.	Portrait	Name (Birth–Death)	Term of office			Ref.
No.	Portrait	Name (Birth–Death)	Took office	Left office	Time in office	Ref.
Commander, Singapore Naval Volunteer Force
1		Lieutenant-Colonel; Jaswant Singh Gill (1923–2020)	1966	1968	1–2 years	
Commander, Maritime Command
2		Mohamed Bin Mohd Salleh	1969	1969	0 years	
3		Geoffrey Vernon Dennis	1969	1970	0–1 years	
4		James Aeria	1970	1975	4–5 years	
Commander, Republic of Singapore Navy
5		Khoo Eng Ann	1975	1985	9–10 years	
6		Commodore; James Leo	November 1985	April 1990	4–5 years	
Chief of Navy
7		Commodore; James Leo	May 1990	May 1991	0–1 years	
8		Rear-Admiral; Teo Chee Hean (born 1954)	1991	7 December 1992	0–1 years	
9		Rear-Admiral; Kwek Siew Jin	8 December 1992	30 June 1996	3–4 years	
10		Rear-Admiral; Richard Lim Cherng Yih	1 July 1996	30 June 1999	2–3 years	
11		Rear-Admiral; Lui Tuck Yew (born 1961)	1 July 1999	1 April 2003	3–4 years	
12		Rear-Admiral; Ronnie Tay (born 1963)	1 April 2003	31 August 2007	4 years, 152 days	
13		Rear-Admiral; Chew Men Leong	31 August 2007	29 March 2011	3 years, 210 days	
14		Rear-Admiral; Ng Chee Peng	29 March 2011	1 August 2014	3 years, 125 days	
15		Rear-Admiral; Lai Chung Han	1 August 2014	16 June 2017	2 years, 319 days	
16		Rear-Admiral; Lew Chuen Hong (born 1976)	16 June 2017	23 March 2020	2 years, 281 days	
17		Rear-Admiral; Aaron Beng (born 1981)	23 March 2020	10 March 2023	2 years, 352 days	
18		Rear-Admiral; Sean Wat	10 March 2023	Incumbent	3 years, 181 days	
